= Index of Andorra-related articles =

Listed below are articles about or related to Andorra, arranged alphabetically:

== A ==
- .ad - Abortion in Andorra - Acadèmia Valenciana de la Llengua - Action for Andorra - Air Travel in Andorra - Aixirivall - Aixovall - Albert Pintat - Albert Salvadó - Alex Antor - Ana Arce - Andbank - Andorra - Andorra at the Olympics - Andorra at the Paralympics - Andorra for Change - Andorra Forward - Andorra in the Eurovision Song Contest - Andorra la Vella - Andorra men's national basketball team - Andorra national football team - Andorra National Library - Andorra national rugby union team - Andorra Telecom - Andorra Televisió - Andorra women's national basketball team - Andorran Cup - Andorran Democratic Centre - Andorran diner - Andorran euro coins - Andorran Football Federation - Andorran nationality law - Andorran Olympic Committee - Andorran parliamentary election, 2001 - Andorran parliamentary election, 2005 - Andorran passport - Andorran Red Cross - Andorran Revolution - Andorran Workers' Union - Ansalonga - Anyós - Arans - Architecture of Andorra - Arinsal - Army of Andorra - Association for the Defense of Nature - Atlètic Club d'Escaldes - Aubinyà

== B ==
- Banca Privada d'Andorra - BC Andorra - Bearded vulture - Bixessarri - Bondia - Boris Skossyreff

== C ==
- .cat - Canillo - Cannabis in Andorra - Capital of Andorra: Andorra la Vella - Capital punishment in Andorra - Casa Cristo - Casa d'Areny-Plandolit - Casa de la Vall - Casa Rull Museum - Catalan Countries - Catalan language - Catalan Wikipedia - Century 21 (political party) - Certers - Citizens' Initiative - Climate of Andorra - Coat of arms of Andorra - Coma Pedrosa - Committed Citizens - Common genet - Communications in Andorra - Concord - Constitution of Andorra - Consulate of the Sea - Council of Europe - COVID-19 pandemic in Andorra - Creand - Culture of Andorra - Currency of Andorra

== D ==
- Democratic Party - Democratic Renewal - Democrats for Andorra - Demographics of Andorra - Diari d'Andorra - Diocese of Urgell - Diplomatic missions of Andorra

== E ==
- Economy of Andorra - Education in Andorra - El buner d'Ordino - El Forn - El Gran Carlemany - El Periòdic d'Andorra - El Serrat - El Tarter - El Vilar - Elections in Andorra - Encamp - Erts - Escaldes Hydroelectric Power Station - Escaldes-Engordany - Escàs - Estadi Comunal d'Andorra la Vella - Estadio Comunal de Aixovall - Estanys de Baiau - European microstate - Executive Council of Andorra - Extreme points of Andorra

== F ==
- FC Encamp - FC Rànger's - FC Santa Coloma - Federació Andorrana de Rugby - Flag of Andorra - Football in Andorra - Fontaneda - Forces Elèctriques d'Andorra - Foreign relations of Andorra - France-Andorra border - Freedom of religion in Andorra - French franc

== G ==
- General Council - Geography of Andorra - Geology of Andorra - Government of Andorra - Gran Valira - Grans Magatzems Pyrénées - Greens of Andorra - Guillem d'Areny-Plandolit

== H ==
- Head of government: Prime Minister of Andorra, Xavier Espot Zamora - Head of state: Co-Princes of Andorra, Emmanuel Macron and Joan Enric Vives i Sicília - Health in Andorra - Hinduism in Andorra - History of Andorra - Hocine Haciane - Human rights in Andorra

== I ==
- Iberian naming customs - Ildefons Lima - Incles - Institut d'Estudis Catalans - Inter Club d'Escaldes - Internet in Andorra - Internet country code top-level domain: .ad - Islam in Andorra - ISO 4217: EUR - ISO country codes: AD, AND, 020 - ISO region codes: See ISO 3166-2:AD

== J ==
- Jacques Chirac - Jaume Bartumeu - Joan Enric Vives i Sicilia - Juberri - Judaism in Andorra - Jugarem A Estimar-Nos - Julian Vila Coma - Justí Guitart i Vilardebó

== K ==
- Koldo Álvarez

== L ==
- L'Aldosa de Canillo - L'Aldosa de la Massana - La Cortinada - La Massana - La Mirada Interior - La Seu d'Urgell - Languages of Andorra - Lauredian Union - Law enforcement in Andorra - Les Bons - LGBT rights in Andorra - Liberal Party of Andorra - Lídia Armengol i Vila - Llorts - Llumeneres - Lusitanos

== M ==
- Madriu-Perafita-Claror Valley - Manuel Sanchis i Guarner - Marc Bernaus - Marc Forné Molné - Marca Hispanica - Marta Roure - Media in Andorra - Melissandre Fuentes - Meritxell - Military history of Andorra - Military of Andorra - Military ranks of Andorra - Ministry of Defence of Andorra - Ministry of External Affairs of Andorra - Ministry of Finance of Andorra - Mora Banc Grup - Music of Andorra

== N ==
- Nagol - National anthem of Andorra - National Archives of Andorra - National Automobile Museum - National Democratic Group - New Centre - New Parliament of Andorra - Nicolas Sarkozy

== O ==
- Official Bulletin of the Principality of Andorra - Òmnium Cultural - Order of Charlemagne - Ordino

== P ==
- Pal - Paréage of Andorra (1278) - Parishes of Andorra - Parliament of Andorra (unicameral): General Council of the Valleys - Parochial Union of Independents Group - Parochial Union of Ordino - Pas de la Casa - Patrimoni Cultural - PGI Management - Police Corps of Andorra - Politics of Andorra - Pompeu Fabra - Population of Andorra: 85,101 (2023) - Postal codes in Andorra - Postal services in Andorra - Prats - President of France - Primera Divisió - Principat - Prostitution in Andorra - Public holidays in Andorra - Pyrenean chamois - Pyrenees

== R ==
- Radio Andorra - Ràdio i Televisió d'Andorra - Rail transport in Andorra - Ramon Iglesias i Navarri - Ramon Llull - Ramón Malla Call - Ransol - Religion in Andorra - Renewal Party of Ordino - Roman Catholicism in Andorra

== S ==
- Sant Julià de Lòria - Santa Coloma - Scouting in Andorra - Segona Divisió - Segudet - Sense Tu - Sispony - Social Democracy and Progress - Social Democratic Party - Softcatalà - Soldeu - Sornàs - Spain-Andorra border - Spanish peseta - Special forces of Andorra - Supreme Court of Andorra: Superior Court of Justice

== T ==
- Taxation in Andorra - Television in Andorra - Third Way - Time in Andorra - Tirant lo Blanc - Tourism in Andorra - Transport in Andorra

== U ==
- UE Sant Julià - Unió de Radioaficionats Andorrans - Unió Sindical d'Andorra - Union, Common Sense and Progress - United States-Andorra relations - Unity and Renewal - Universitat d'Andorra

== V ==
- Vehicle registration plates of Andorra - Vila - Visa policy of Andorra

== W ==
- Western capercaillie

== Lists ==
- List of Andorrans - Ants of Andorra - Banks of Andorra - Birds of Andorra - Bridges of Andorra - Cities of Andorra - Companies of Andorra - List of Co-Princes of Andorra - Diplomatic missions in Andorra - Diplomatic missions of Andorra - Exports of Andorra - List of first syndics of the General Council - Football clubs of Andorra - List of general syndics of the General Council - Mammals of Andorra - Museums of Andorra - Political parties of Andorra - Years of Andorra

== See also ==
- Outline of Andorra
