= Outline of Andorra =

Country, landlocked between Spain and France

The Flag of Andorra

The Coat of arms of Andorra

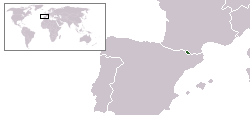
The location of Andorra

Flagmap of Andorra

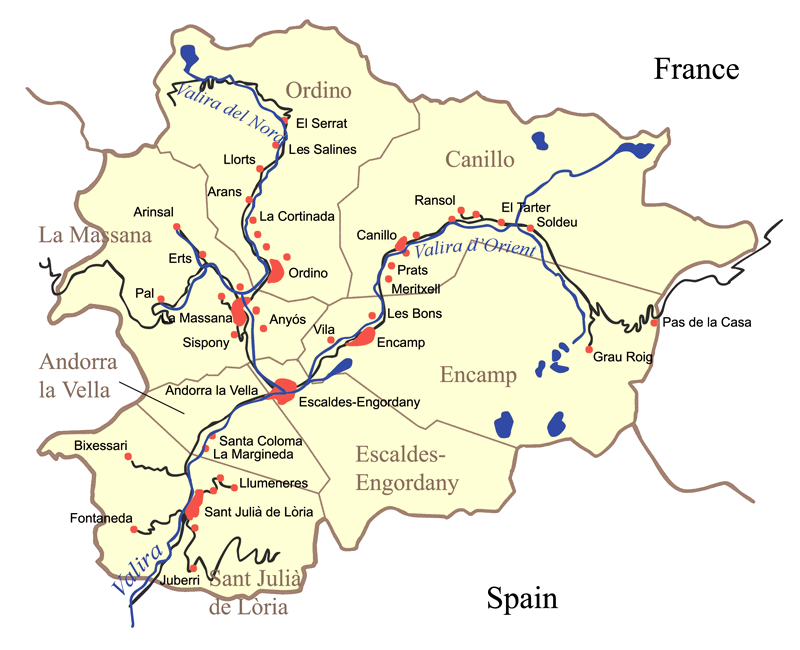
An enlargeable map of the Principality of Andorra

The following outline is provided as an overview of and topical guide to Andorra:

Principality of Andorra – small landlocked sovereign country located in the eastern Pyrenees Mountains of Southern Europe and bordered by Spain and France. Once isolated, it is currently a prosperous country mainly because of tourism and its status as a tax haven. The people of Andorra are currently listed as having the eighth highest human life expectancy on Earth, at an average of 82.9 years at birth (2017 est).

== General reference ==
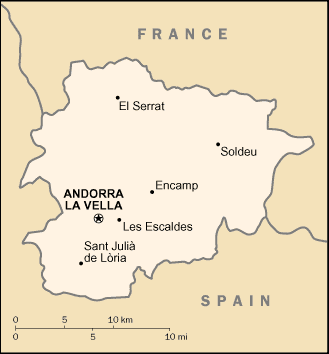
An enlargeable basic map of Andorra

- Pronunciation: /ænˈdɔːrə/, UK also /ænˈdɒrə/
- Common English country name: Andorra
- Official English country name: The Principality of Andorra
- Common endonym(s): Andorra
- Official endonym(s): Principat d'Andorra
- Adjectival(s): Andorran
- Demonym(s): Andorrà, Andorrana
- Etymology: Name of Andorra
- ISO country codes: AD, AND, 020
- ISO region codes: See ISO 3166-2:AD
- Internet country code top-level domain: .ad

== Geography of Andorra ==
An enlargeable topographic map of Andorra

Geography of Andorra

- Andorra is: a landlocked country and a European microstate
- Location:
  - Northern Hemisphere and Eastern Hemisphere
  - Eurasia
    - Europe
      - Southern Europe
        - Iberian Peninsula
          - On the border between Spain and France
        - Pyrenees mountain range
  - Time zone: Central European Time (UTC+01), Central European Summer Time (UTC+02)
  - Extreme points of Andorra
    - High: Coma Pedrosa 2,942 m (9,652 ft)
    - Low: Valira River 840 m (2,756 ft)
  - Land boundaries: 120.3 km

Spain 63.7 km
France 56.6 km

- Coastline: none

- Population of Andorra: 89,058 (2025) - 185th most populous country
- Area of Andorra: 468 square kilometres (181 sq mi) - 196th largest country
- Atlas of Andorra

=== Environment of Andorra ===
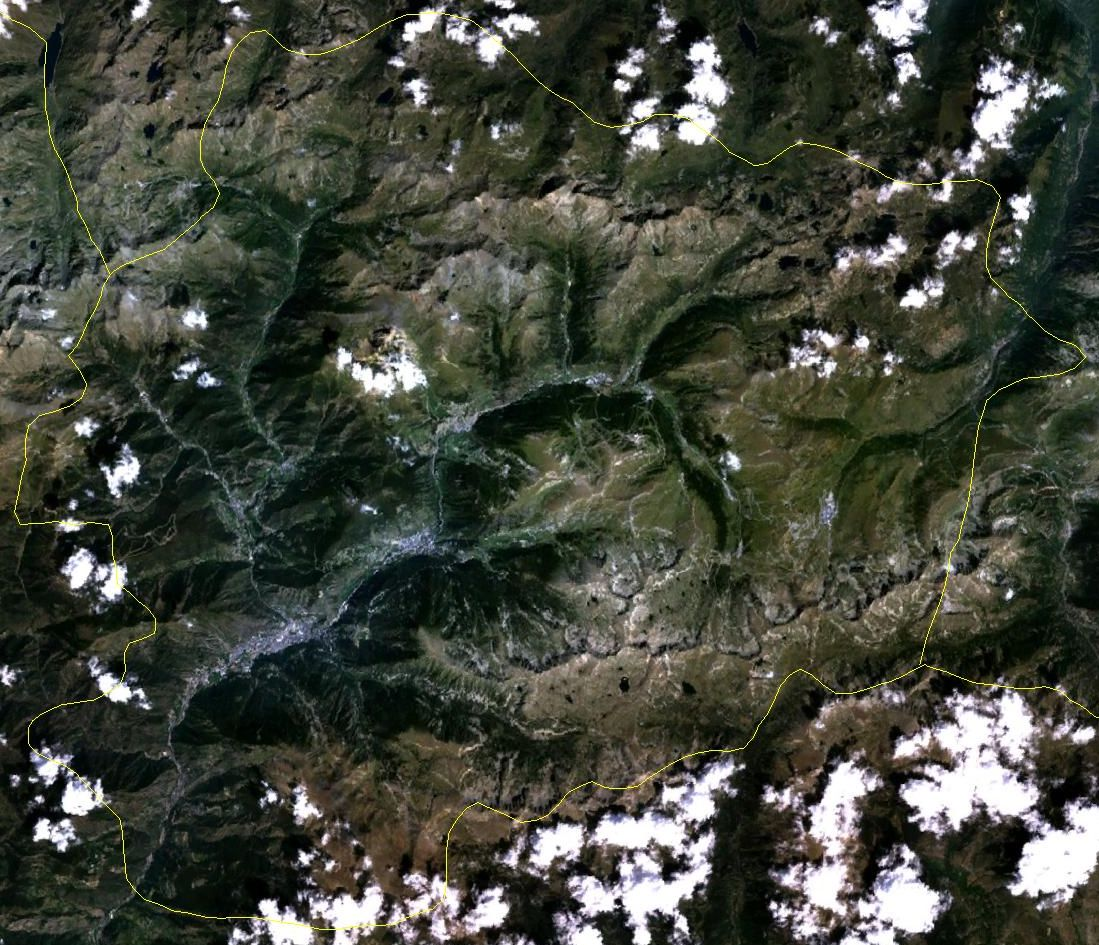
An enlargeable satellite image of Andorra in August

Environment of Andorra

- Climate of Andorra
- Environmental issues in Andorra
- Geology of Andorra
  - Fauna of Andorra
    - Birds of Andorra
      - Bearded vulture
      - Western capercaillie
    - Mammals of Andorra
      - Common genet
      - Pyrenean chamois

==== Natural geographic features of Andorra ====
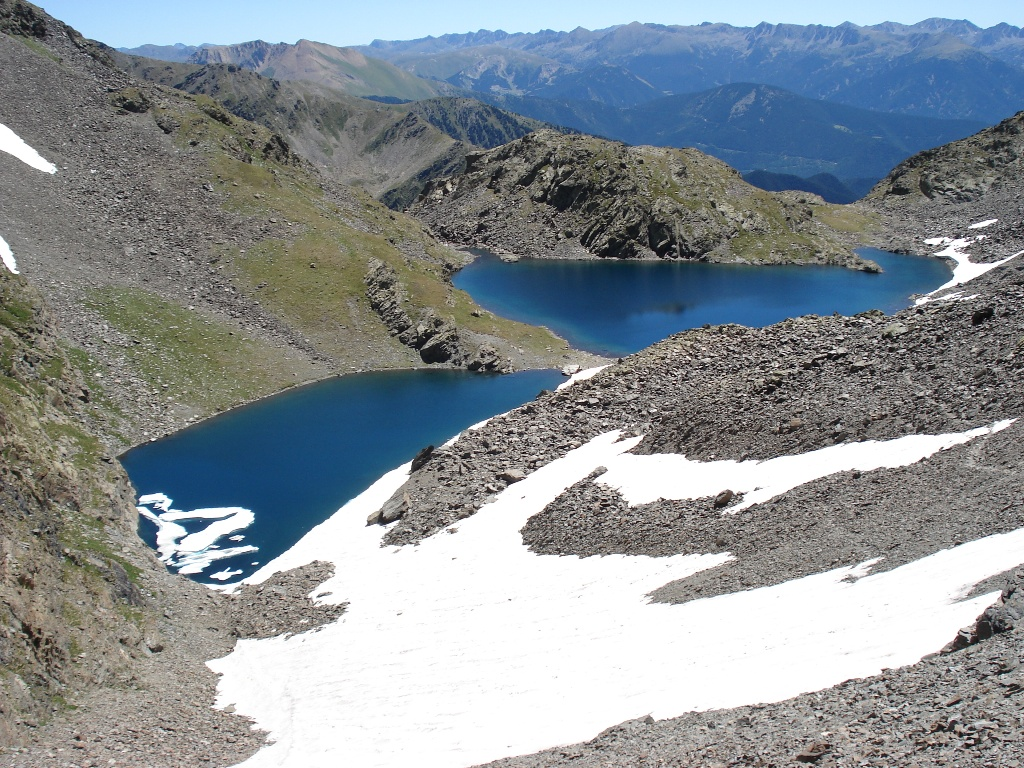
Estanys Forcatsdeux, two alpine lakes located near the Pic de Médécourbe and the Pic de Coma Pedrosa

- Mountains of Andorra
  - Coma Pedrosa
  - Pic de Médécourbe
  - Pic de Sanfonts
  - Pic del Port Vell
  - Pic dels Aspres
  - Roca Entravessada
- World Heritage Sites in Andorra

=== Demographics of Andorra ===
- Demographics of Andorra

=== Regions of Andorra ===
==== Administrative divisions of Andorra ====
- Parishes of Andorra
  - List of cities and towns in Andorra

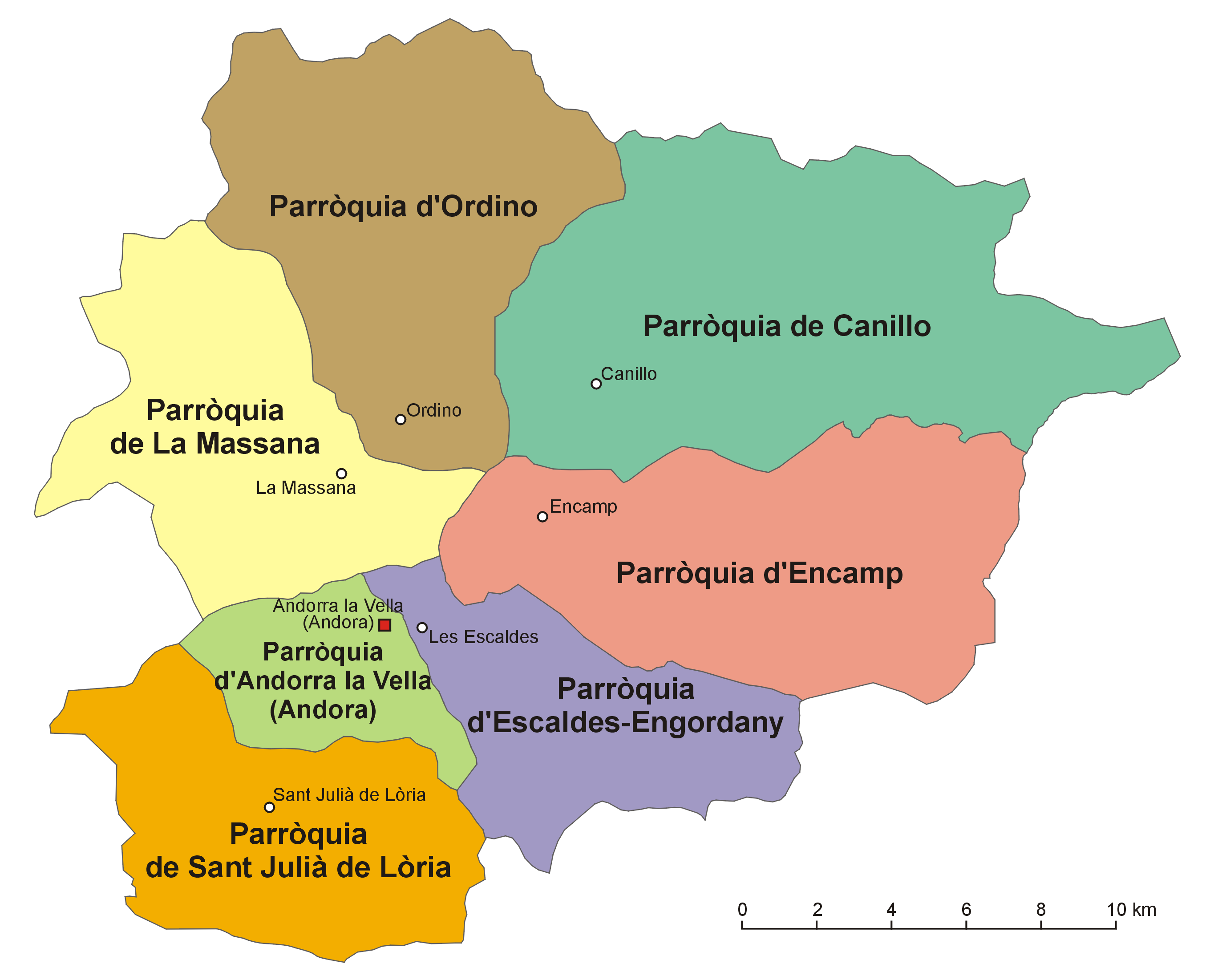
Andorra consists of seven parishes:

- Andorra la Vella
- Canillo
- Encamp
- Escaldes-Engordany
- La Massana
- Ordino
- Sant Julià de Lòria
- Capital of Andorra: Andorra la Vella
- Cities of Andorra

=== Demography of Andorra ===
Demographics of Andorra

== Government and politics of Andorra ==
Politics of Andorra

- Form of government: parliamentary representative democracy
- Capital of Andorra: Andorra la Vella
- Elections in Andorra
- Political parties in Andorra
- Official Bulletin of the Principality of Andorra

=== Branches of government ===
Government of Andorra

==== Executive branch of the government of Andorra ====
- Head of state: Co-Princes of Andorra: Josep-Lluís Serrano Pentinat & Emmanuel Macron
- Head of government: Prime Minister of Andorra, Xavier Espot Zamora
- Executive Council of Andorra

==== Legislative branch of the government of Andorra ====
- Parliament of Andorra (unicameral): General Council of the Valleys

==== Judicial branch of the government of Andorra ====
Court system of Andorra

- Supreme Court of Andorra: Superior Court of Justice

=== Foreign relations of Andorra ===
Foreign relations of Andorra

- List of diplomatic missions in Andorra
- Diplomatic missions of Andorra
- Andorra–France relations
- United States-Andorra relations

==== International organization membership ====
The Principality of Andorra is a member of:

- Council of Europe (CE)
- Food and Agriculture Organization (FAO)
- International Civil Aviation Organization (ICAO)
- International Criminal Court (ICCt)
- International Criminal Police Organization (Interpol)
- International Federation of Red Cross and Red Crescent Societies (IFRCS)
- International Olympic Committee (IOC)
- International Red Cross and Red Crescent Movement (ICRM)
- International Telecommunication Union (ITU)
- Inter-Parliamentary Union (IPU)
- Organisation internationale de la Francophonie (OIF)
- Organization for Security and Cooperation in Europe (OSCE)
- Organisation for the Prohibition of Chemical Weapons (OPCW)
- Unió Llatina
- United Nations (UN)
- United Nations Conference on Trade and Development (UNCTAD)
- United Nations Educational, Scientific, and Cultural Organization (UNESCO)
- World Customs Organization (WCO)
- World Health Organization (WHO)
- World Intellectual Property Organization (WIPO)
- World Tourism Organization (UNWTO)
- World Trade Organization (WTO) (observer)

=== Law and order in Andorra ===
- Constitution of Andorra
- Human rights in Andorra
  - LGBT rights in Andorra
  - Women in Andorra
  - Freedom of religion in Andorra
- Law enforcement in Andorra
  - Capital punishment in Andorra
  - Police Corps of Andorra

=== Military of Andorra ===
Military of Andorra

- Police Corps of Andorra

=== Political parties in Andorra ===
- Political parties
  - Andorran Democratic Centre
  - Century 21 (political party)
  - Democratic Party (Andorra)
  - Democratic Renewal (Andorra)
  - Greens of Andorra
  - Lauredian Union
  - Liberal Party of Andorra
  - Parochial Union of Independents Group
  - Parochial Union of Ordino
  - Renewal Party of Ordino
  - Social Democratic Party (Andorra)
  - Union, Common Sense and Progress
  - Unity and Renewal

== History of Andorra ==
History of Andorra

== Culture of Andorra ==
Culture of Andorra

- Language in Andorra
  - Spanish language
  - Catalan language
- Media in Andorra
  - Newspapers
  - Radio and television
  - Television in Andorra
- Museums in Andorra
  - Casa Cristo
- Music of Andorra
- National symbols of Andorra
  - Coat of arms of Andorra
  - Flag of Andorra
  - National anthem of Andorra
- Prostitution in Andorra
- Public holidays in Andorra
- Religion in Andorra
  - Christianity in Andorra
    - Roman Catholicism in Andorra
  - Islam in Andorra
  - Judaism in Andorra
- Scouting and Guiding in Andorra
- World Heritage Sites in Andorra

=== Sports in Andorra ===
- Andorra at the 2006 Winter Paralympics
- Andorra national rugby union team
- Federació Andorrana de Rugby

==== Football in Andorra ====
- Andorra national football team
- Andorran Football Federation
- Football in Andorra

===== Andorran football clubs =====
- Atlètic Club d'Escaldes
- FC Encamp
- Inter Club d'Escaldes
- Lusitanos
- Principat
- FC Rànger's
- UE Sant Julià
- FC Santa Coloma

===== Andorran football competitions =====
- Andorran Cup
- Andorran First Division

===== Football venues in Andorra =====
- Estadio Comunal de Aixovall
- Estadi Comunal d'Andorra la Vella

==== Andorra at the Olympics ====
- Andorra at the 1976 Summer Olympics
- Andorra at the 1980 Summer Olympics
- Andorra at the 1996 Summer Olympics
- Andorra at the 2000 Summer Olympics
- Andorra at the 2004 Summer Olympics
- Andorra at the 2006 Winter Olympics
- Andorra at the 2010 Winter Olympics

==== Basketball in Andorra ====
- Andorra national basketball team
- BC Andorra

== Economy and infrastructure of Andorra ==
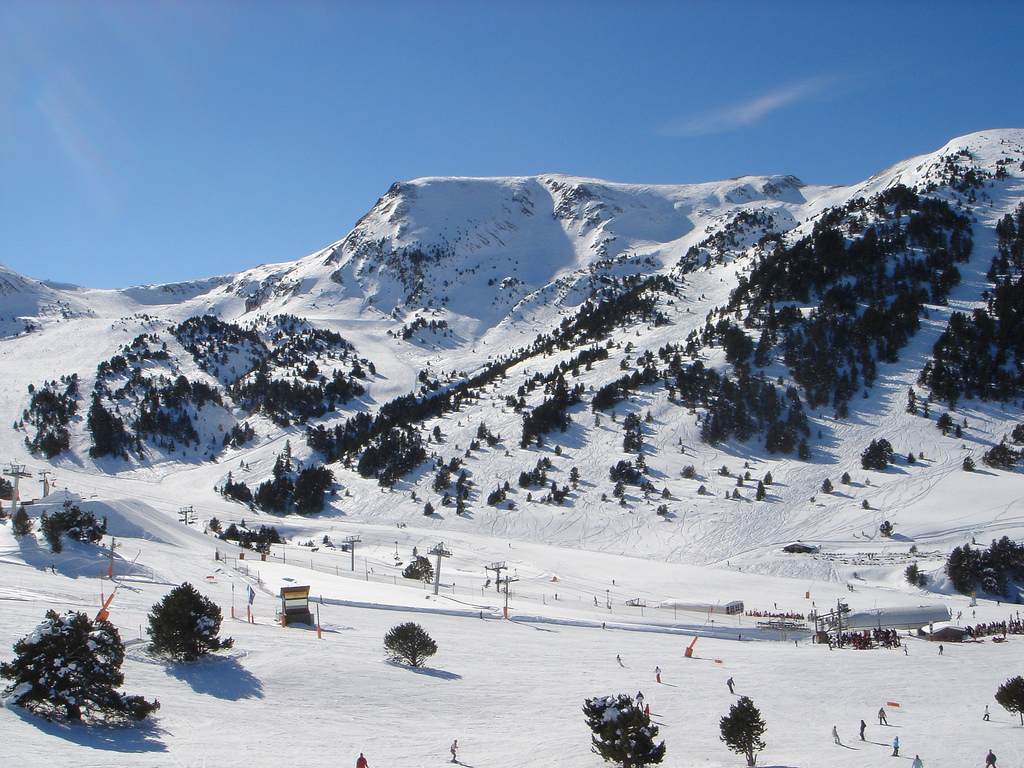
Grandvalira ski resort, popular with tourists from Spain, France and the United Kingdom

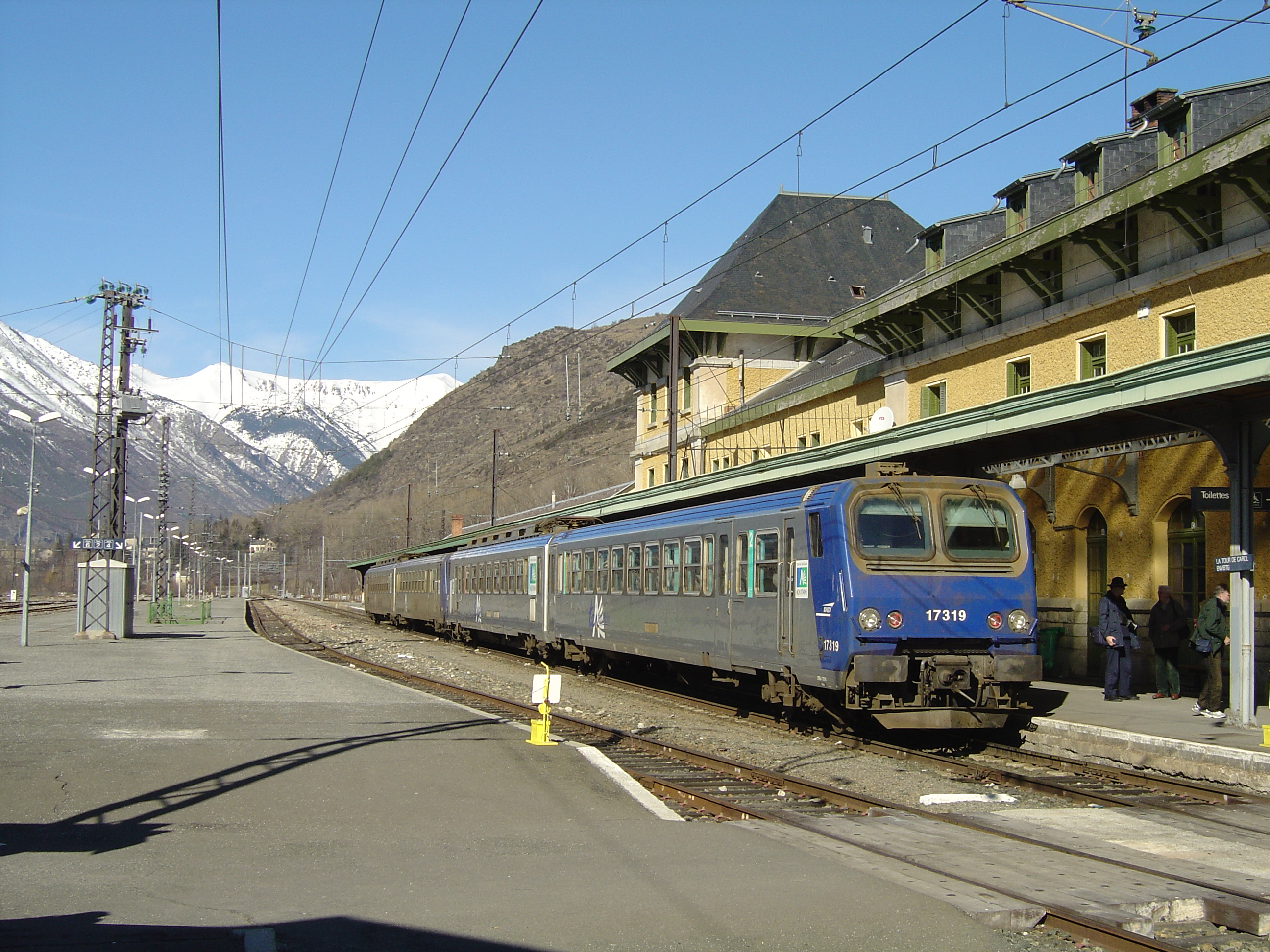
A train at Latour-de-Carol, one of the two stations serving Andorra

Economy of Andorra

- Economic rank, by nominal GDP (2007): 147th (one hundred and forty seventh)
- Banks in Andorra
- Communications in Andorra
  - Internet in Andorra
  - Postal services in Andorra
- Companies of Andorra
- Currency of Andorra: Euro (see also: Euro topics)
  - ISO 4217: EUR
  - Andorran euro coins
  - Previous currency: Andorran diner
- Taxation in Andorra
- Tourism in Andorra
  - Hotels
  - Museums
  - Visa policy of Andorra
- Trade Union of Andorra
- Transport in Andorra
  - Airports in Andorra
  - Rail transport in Andorra

== Education in Andorra ==
Education in Andorra

- Universitat d'Andorra

== Andorran people ==
Andorran people

- Ramón Malla Call

=== Andorran people by occupation ===
==== Andorran photographers ====
- Ana Arce

=== Andorran politicians ===
- Jaume Bartumeu
- Julian Vila Coma
- Marc Forné Molné
- Albert Pintat

=== Andorran sportspeople ===
- Hocine Haciane

==== Andorran alpine skiers ====
- Alex Antor

==== Andorran curlers ====
- Ana Arce

==== Andorran figure skaters ====
- Melissandre Fuentes

==== Andorran footballers ====
- Marc Bernaus
- Koldo
- Ildefons Lima

== See also ==
Andorra

- Index of Andorra-related articles
- List of international rankings
- Member state of the United Nations
- Outline of Europe
- Outline of geography
