= BOPA (disambiguation) =

BOPA (Danish: Borgerlige Partisaner, Civil Partisans) was part of the Danish resistance movement during World War II.

BOPA may also refer to:

- Official Bulletin of the Principality of Andorra
- Bopa, a town, arrondissement, and commune in Mono Department, Benin
