= Culture of Iberia =

Iberia is a region of Southwestern Europe including Spain, Portugal and Andorra.

Culture of Iberia may refer to:

- Culture of Spain
- Culture of Portugal
- Culture of Andorra

== See also ==
- Culture of Europe
- Cultural policies of the European Union
