= Judiciary of Andorra =

Independent body within the Andorran government

The judicial system on Andorra is an independent body within the government of the Principality of Andorra. It is composed of:

- The Batllia of Andorra, who judges, in the first instance, minor offenses and criminal offenses as well as civil and administrative litigation,
- The Tribunal de Corts that decides on the crimes majors and, in appeal, the resources against the judgments dictated by the Court of Batlles (Batllia),
- The Supreme Court of Andorra comprises a president and eight magistrates appointed by the Superior Council of Justice with jurisdiction over civil, administrative and criminal matters,
- The Superior Council of Justice of Andorra as the organ of representation, government and administration of the judiciary and who oversees the independence and good functioning of justice and
- The Fiscal Ministry
- The Constitutional Court of Andorra who is in charge of interpreting the Constitution of Andorra, as well as deciding on the adaptation of the remaining laws to it, and is made up of four magistrates.

== See also ==
- Law of Andorra

== Official link ==
Constitucional Tribunal
