= Union, Common Sense and Progress =

Political party in Andorra

Union, Common Sense and Progress (Catalan: Unió, Seny i Progrés) was a political party in Canillo, Andorra. USiP contested the Andorran parliamentary election, 1992 on a joint list with Unity and Renewal. The list was the only one presented in the Canillo parochial constituency, and it won all four parliamentary seats (3 for Unity and Renewal, 1 for USiP).
