= Andorran Red Cross =

National Red Cross Society in Andorra

- Creu Roja Andorrana
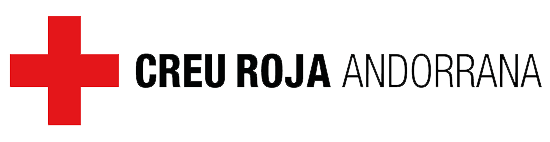
- Formation: March 24, 1994; 32 years ago
- Purpose: Humanitarian Aid
- Headquarters: Andorra la Vella
- Region served: Andorra
- President: Josep Duró Vidal
- Revenue: €2,287,843 (2023)
- Website: www.creuroja.ad

The Andorran Red Cross (Catalan: Creu Roja Andorrana) is a humanitarian organization that provides emergency assistance, disaster relief and education within Andorra. The organization was founded in 1980, and was officially recognized as the 162nd National Society member of the International Federation of Red Cross and Red Crescent Societies on March 24, 1994. Its headquarters are in Andorra la Vella.

== History ==
In 1979 the Rotary Club of Andorra presented a petition to request the creation of the Red Cross in Andorra. The Red Cross society was created in 1980, and on 24 March 1994 was officially recognized as the 162nd National Society member of the International Federation of Red Cross and Red Crescent Societies. In 2010, a law passed which recognizes the Andorran Red Cross as a voluntary humanitarian institution of public interest, which carries out its activities as an auxiliary and collaborator of public administrations under the protection of the State.

The Andorran Red Cross headquarters are in Andorra la Vella. A new building, owned by the Andorran Red Cross, was inaugurated in 2016, after a donation by Genoviève Chicoix.

== Activities ==
The Andorran Red Cross was initially focused on providing emergency assistance and disaster relief within Andorra, but since then their work has expanded to include medical education and disaster preparedness.

During the COVID-19 pandemic, the ARC organized a national antibody screening process, using 800 volunteers, provided medical and practical support to confined people, and ran a national telephone hotline service.
