= Softcatalà =

Association promoting Catalan language usage in technology

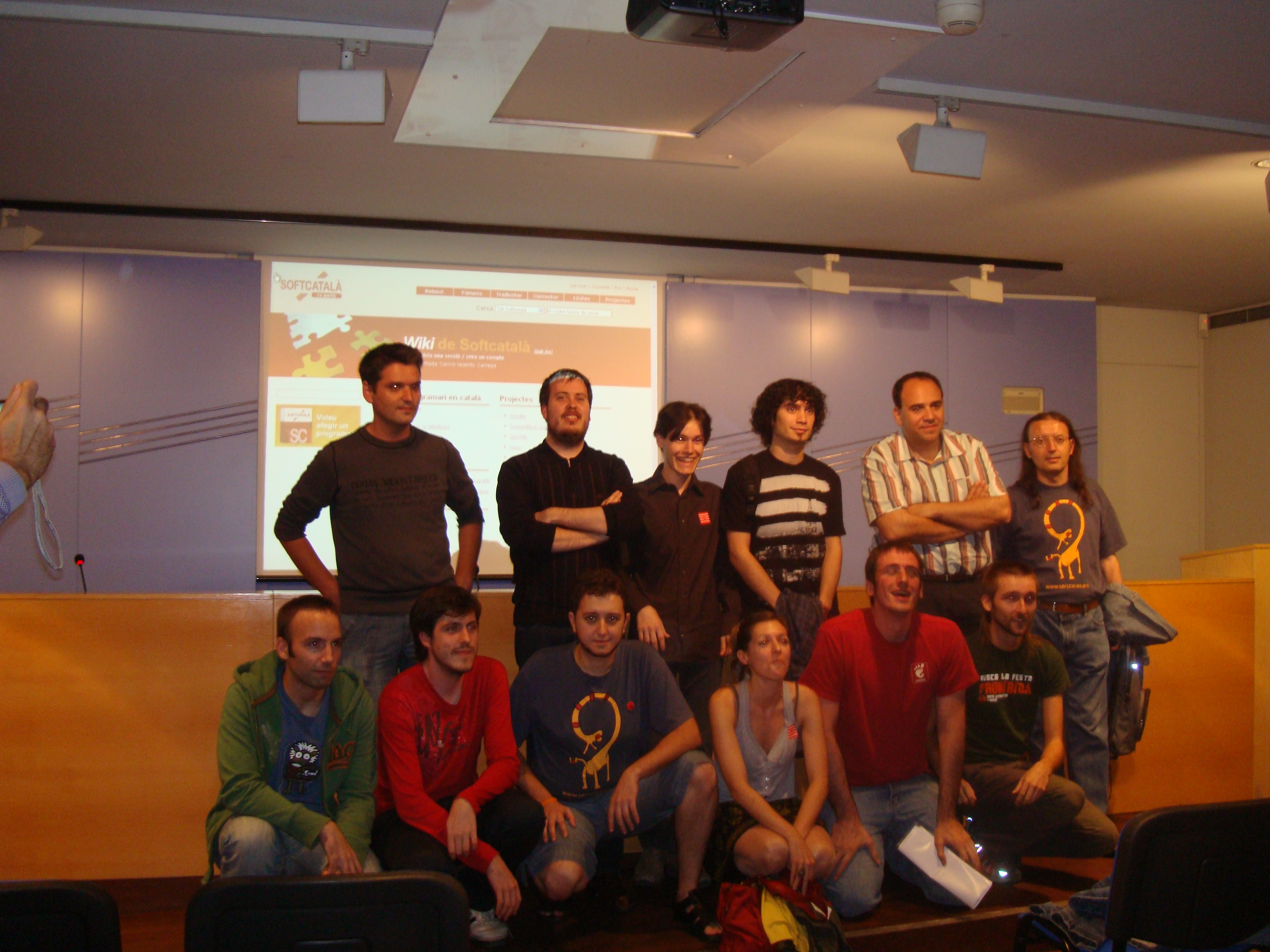
Softcatala 10th anniversary group photo in MHCAT

Softcatalà is a non-profit association that promotes the use of the Catalan language on computing, Internet and new technologies. This association consists of computer specialists, philologists, translators, students and all kind of volunteers that work in the field of translating software into Catalan, in order to preserve this language in the English-controlled software environment. They also offer several linguistic tools to help users improve their language knowledge.

== History ==
Softcatalà was born in 1997 as a group of volunteers with the aim of improving the presence of Catalan in new technologies. The first step was to translate the most important free and/or open-source software based programs (OpenOffice.org, Firefox, etc.) into Catalan. After that, they delivered some other projects, including the following ones:

- 1,500 English-Catalan words glossary for software translation.
- Software translation style guide
- Translation memory with more than 40,000 entries (including translations made by Softcatalà)
- Spell-checker

== Collaborations ==
During this last years, Softcatalà has collaborated with the terminology centre TERMCAT standardizing new Catalan terms related to new technologies.

In 2001, they started collaborating with Google, and that permitted the translation of the interface and later, the participation in the adaptation of the search engine related to Catalan pages. They have also worked on the popularization of Linux, translating GNOME and some installation and configuration tools of Mandriva and Fedora.

== Web-page ==
The main Internet site for Softcatalà is only available in Catalan. It offers all the information about the group and explains its reasons and objectives. The web page consists of six different sections:

- Pantry: Links to software resources organized in different sections (Internet, multimedia, image, language…) for Windows, Linux and Mac.
- Forums: Forums focused on solving doubts related to the language used by programmers.
- Spell-checker: On-line spell-checker available in general Catalan and also in Valencian. It only corrects orthographic mistakes.
- Translator: Ruled-based machine translator based on the technology by Apertium and Scale MT. It offers the chance of translating from Catalan to Spanish and vice versa. There are also new versions which are being tested (French, English, Portuguese, Aranese Occitan and Aragonese to Catalan and vice versa).
- Lists: some mail lists belonging to llistes.softcatala.org.
- Projects: Projects in which Softcatalà is involved, including OpenOffice.org, Mozilla, GNOME, Ubuntu, Open Thesaurus-ca…
