= Antoni Fiter i Rossell =

Andorran author

Anthony Fiter i Rossell
- Born: 6 May 1706
- Died: 28 October 1748 (aged 42)
- Occupation: Episcopal Vigil
- Writing career
- Period: October 12, 1737 - October 28, 1748

Antoni Fiter i Rossell (6 May 1706 – 28 October 1748) was an Andorran lawyer and author. He served as the episcopal Vicar of Andorra. He is the author of the historical and legal collection Manual digest de las valls neutras de Andorra (1748).

== Biography ==
Antoni Filer i Rossell was born on May 6, 1706, in Ordino. His father Joan Fiter was a knight of the house of Fiter d'ares. His mother, Joanna Ogne Rossel, the pubilla of an old Andorean family. Joan Fiter died in June 1718. Joanna re-married, though her new husband died in 1729. Upon his death, Filter began to manage the family estate. Fiter remained unmarried and so, in 1741, Ogne named her other son, Pere, as heir to the family estate.

Filter studied at the school of Sant Andreu (Jesuits) in Seo-d'Urgell, where his cousin Anthony Moles y Rossell worked as a professor of decretals. He studied law and received his doctorate in 1731. In 1737, he became the episcopal vicar of Andorra. It was sometime after this appointment that he was instructed by the General Council to write his Digest manual de las valls neutras de Andorra. He completed it in 1748.
