= List of companies of Andorra =

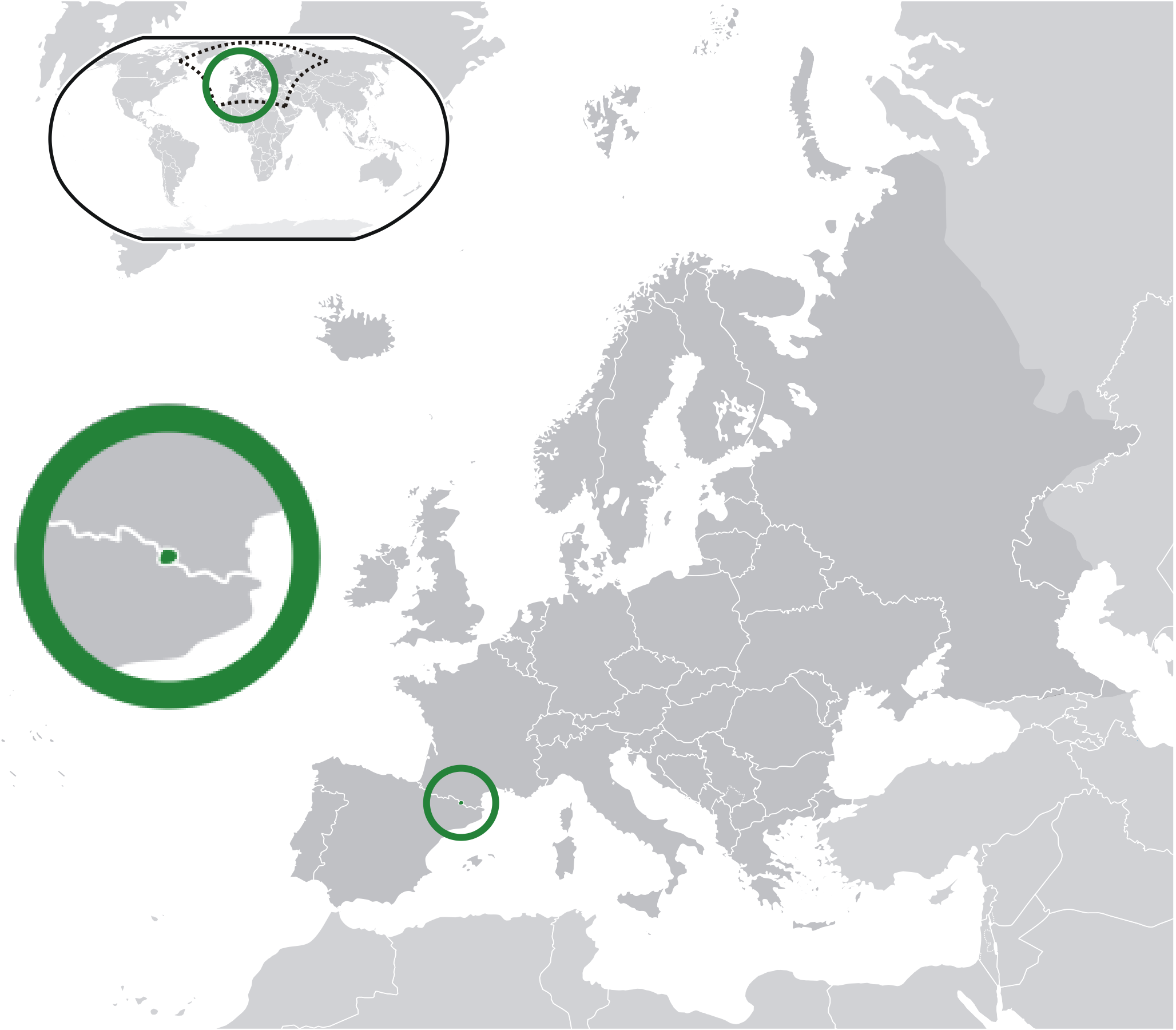
Location of Andorra

Andorra is a sovereign landlocked microstate in Southwestern Europe, located in the eastern Pyrenees mountains and bordered by Spain and France. Tourism, the mainstay of Andorra's economy, accounts for roughly 80% of GDP. An estimated 10.2 million tourists visit annually, attracted by Andorra's duty-free status and by its summer and winter resorts.

== Notable firms ==
This list includes notable companies with primary headquarters located in the country. The industry and sector follow the Industry Classification Benchmark taxonomy. Organizations which have ceased operations are included and noted as defunct.

Notable companies Status: P=Private, S=State; A=Active, D=Defunct
Name	Industry	Sector	Headquarters	Founded	Notes	Status	
Andbank	Financials	Banks	Andorra la Vella	1930	Private bank	P	A
Andorra Telecom	Telecommunications	Fixed line telecommunications	Santa Coloma d'Andorra	1949	National telecom	S	A
Banca Privada d'Andorra	Financials	Banks	Escaldes-Engordany	1957	Private bank	P	D
Crèdit Andorrà	Financials	Banks	Andorra la Vella	1949	Banking cooperative	P	A
Grans Magatzems Pyrénées	Consumer services	Broadline retailers	Andorra la Vella	1930	Department store	P	A
Mora Banc Grup	Financials	Banks	Andorra la Vella	1956	Bank	P	A
PGI Management	Consumer services	Recreational services	Andorra la Vella	1957	Ski management	P	A

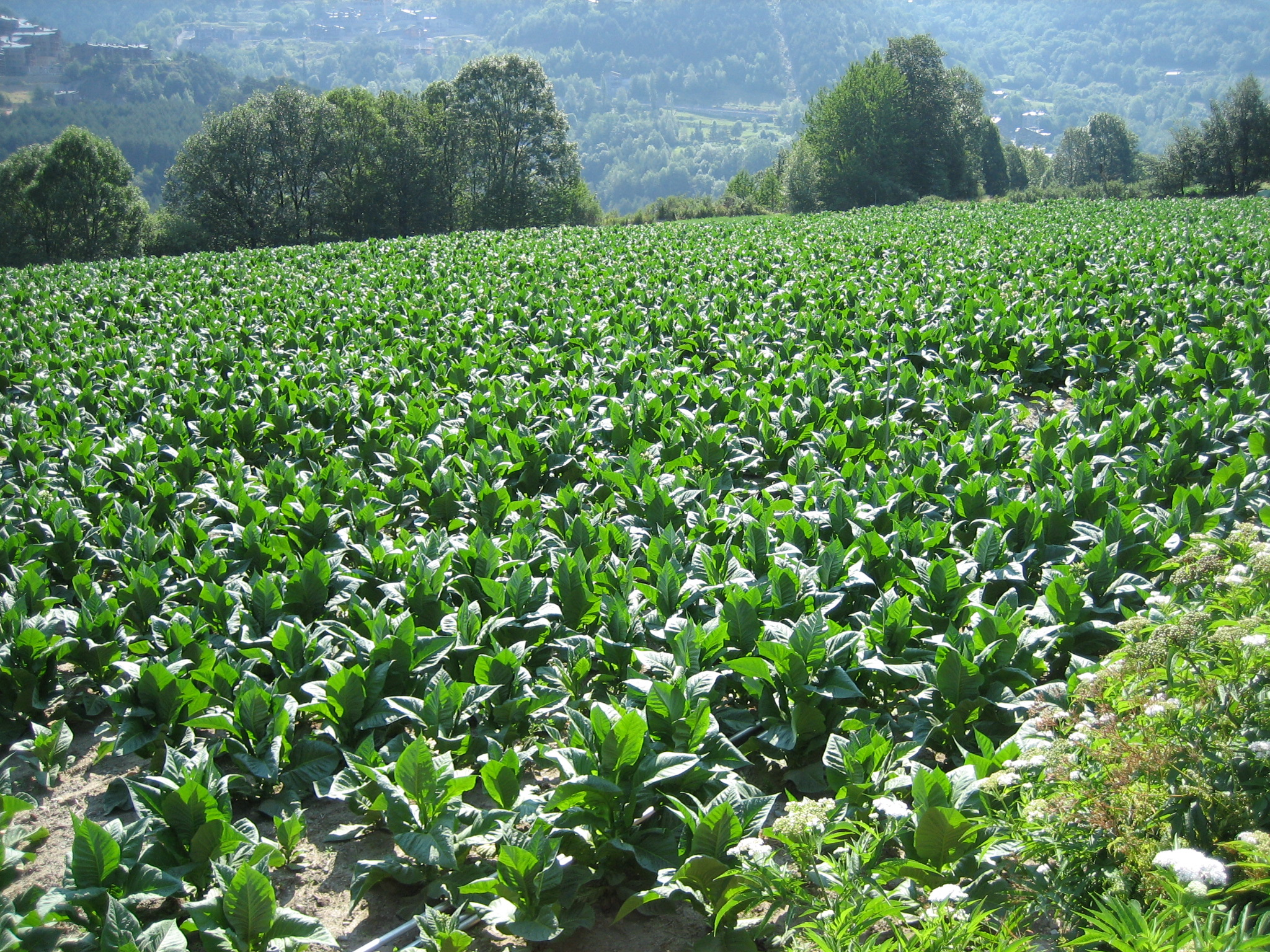
A field of tobacco plants in Sispony.

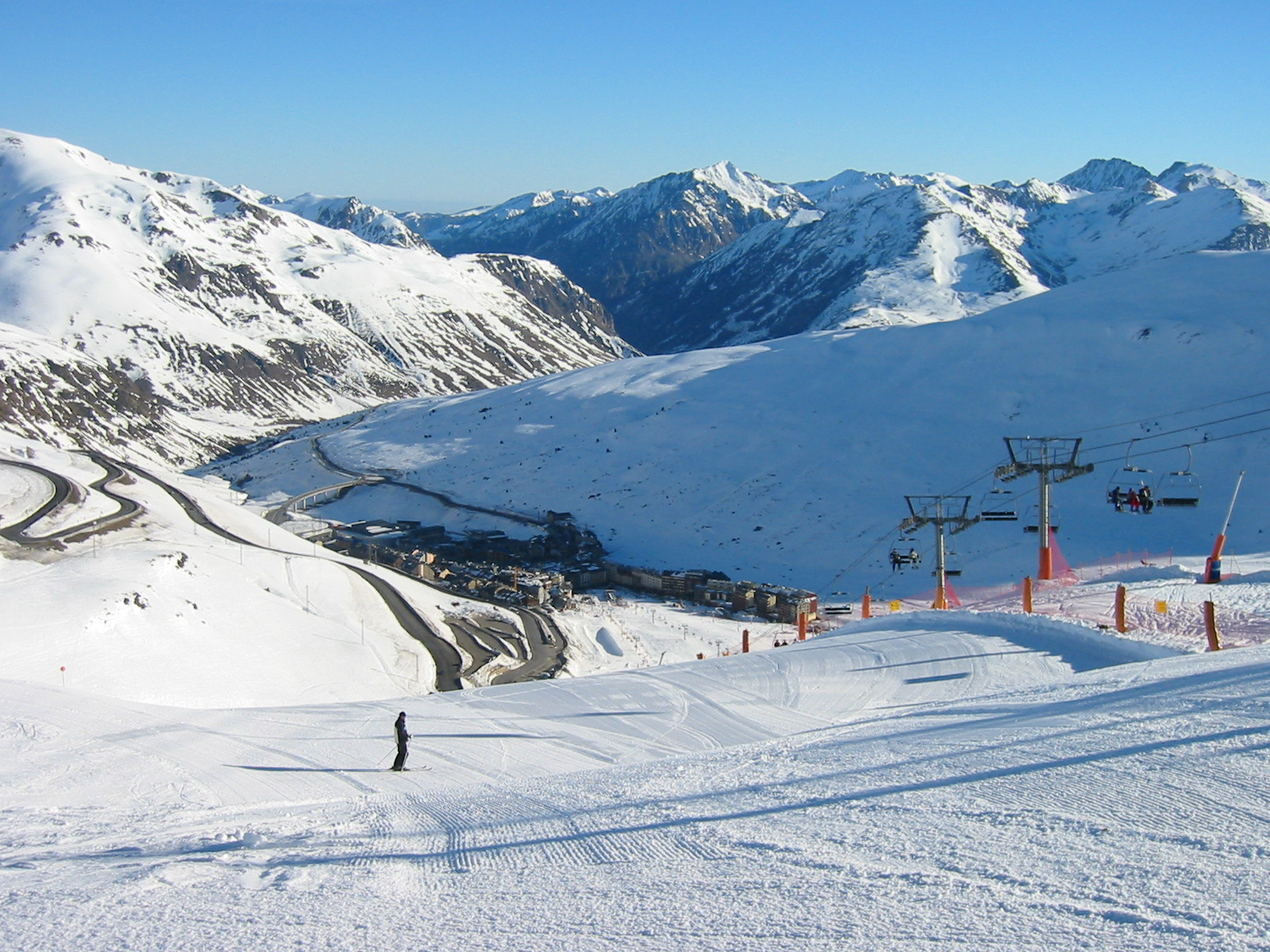
Resort in El Pas de la Casa, looking towards France.

Andbank branch in Andorra la Vella.
