= Postal codes in Andorra =

Postal codes in Andorra were introduced in July 2004. As postal services in Andorra are run by Correos of Spain and La Poste of France, postal codes were introduced in cooperation with both countries' postal administrations. Each of the seven parishes of Andorra has its own post code (or codi postal in Catalan).

Parish	Post Code
Canillo	AD100
Encamp	AD200
Ordino	AD300
La Massana	AD400
Andorra la Vella	AD500
Sant Julià de Lòria	AD600
Escaldes-Engordany	AD700

PO Boxes in Andorra la Vella have separate postcodes allocated to each PO Box number range.
