= List of museums in Andorra =

This is a list of museums in Andorra.

- National Automobile Museum
- Areny-Plandolit house museum
- Andorran postal museum
- Rull house museum
- The Viladomat museum
- The Andorran model museum
- Nicolaï Siadristy's Microminiature museum
- Perfume museum
- Museu Casa Cristo

== See also ==
- List of libraries in Andorra
- List of archives in Andorra
- List of museums by country
