= Freedom of religion in Andorra =

The Constitution of Andorra provides for freedom of religion; it also names the Roman Catholic Bishop of Urgell as joint head of state with the President of France, offering the Catholic Church privileges not available to other religious groups.

== Religious demography ==
The country has an area of 470 square kilometres (180 sq mi) and in 2021, it had a population of 81,588. Few official statistics are available on religion; estimates of the Catholic population range from 89.5% and 99.21%.

The population consists largely of immigrants from Spain, Portugal, and France, with full citizens representing less than 36% of the total. The immigrants are also generally Catholic. It is estimated that, of the Catholic population, half are active church attendees. Other Christian groups include the New Apostolic Church; the Church of Jesus Christ of Latter-day Saints (Mormons); the Anglican Church; the Reunification Church; and Jehovah's Witnesses. It is estimated that about 100 Jews and 2000 Muslims live in the country, as well as a small group of Hindus.

== Status of religious freedom ==
The Catholic religious celebration on September 8 of the Verge de Meritxell (Virgin of Meritxell) is a national holiday.

Non-Catholic faiths do not have legal status as religious groups. Groups wishing to build property or receive government funding must register with the government as a cultural organization.

In spite of negotiations for some years between the Muslim community and the Government, no mosque has been built. Nevertheless, the country's Muslims have "prayer spaces" and there appear to be no restrictions on the number of these places of worship scattered throughout the country.

Instruction in the tenets of the Catholic faith is available in public schools on an optional basis. In 2022, parliament banned the use of conspicuous religious symbols in public schools and approved a decree providing an online schooling option for students who choose not to attend in person due to this ban.

== Societal abuses and discrimination ==
In 2022, the law provides for fines of up to 24,000 euros ($26,000) in cases of discrimination.

In 2023, the country was scored 3 out of 4 for religious freedom; talks continue regarding creating a burial ground for Muslims and Jews.

== See also ==
- Religion in Andorra
- Catholic Church in Andorra
- Human rights in Andorra
