= Association for the Defense of Nature =

- Associació per a la Defensa de la Natura
- Founded: 1986
- Type: Non-governmental organization
- Purpose: Environmentalism
- Location: Andorra la Vella
- Region served: Andorra
- Website: adn-andorra.org

The Association for the Defense of Nature (ADN; Associació per a la Defensa de la Natura) is an Andorran non-governmental organization that was founded in 1986 as a result of the concern of a group of people for the environment. It aims to protect and study nature in Andorra. The ADN pursues its aims through three basic lines of action: conservation, study and information.

== History ==
The ADN was founded in 1986 by...

== Conservation ==
ADN carries out direct actions that result in the conservation of nature. For instance, they engage with environmental protection laws and planning policies that affect human impacts on the environment, and encourage the creation of protected natural areas by suggesting areas in need of protection, and appropriate management of those areas. ADN monitors and safeguards endangered species in Andorra, both flora and fauna. ADN is also concerned with finding solutions to the problems of waste and pollution, including water quality.

== Study ==
ADN contributes to research on the environment and this protection:

- Promotes and develops scientific basis for conservation actions and proposals.
- Learn lesser known natural elements of our country, analyzing the situation and proposing measures for their protection.

== Information ==
The ADN is to discover and appreciate nature and therefore:

- Organizers:

Check educational tours to the mountain and protected natural areas Conferences, symposia and debates. Shares of environmental education with a solid scientific basis, in coordination with other institutions.

- Edit and spreads:

Informative publications on the natural heritage of Andorra and the need to preserve it. The periodical "Aigüerola".

== Collaboration ==
It is affiliate to BirdLife International. BirdLife is the largest world organization for the study and protection of birds and their habitats.

Maintains contact and exchanges with many international organizations with similar objectives.

Participates and organizes symposia and international conferences.
