= Scouting and Guiding in Andorra =

Scouting and Guiding associations in Andorra

- Country: Andorra

Scouting and Guiding in Andorra is represented by a single coeducational Scout and Guide group, based in Sant Julià de Lòria and founded in 2016. There had previously been a Scout Association, called Scouts d'Andorra, which became dormant in the 1980s. The principality issued a Scout Centenary stamp in 2007.

== History ==
Until 2016, Andorra was one of only six of the world's independent countries that do not have Scouting. The former Scout association of the country in the Pyrenees, Scouts d'Andorra, has been dormant since the 1980s. Young people in Andorra interested in scouting often travel to France or Spain to join groups there. Scouting groups from other countries sometimes visit Andorra as part of their activities, such as hiking or skiing.

The principality issued Scout Centenary stamps for the 2007 celebration, through both French and Spanish posts. The stamp design featured a drawing of a hand making the international three-finger Scout salute, superimposed on text about scouting, headed 'L'escoltisme'. The stamp had a value of 0.54 euros.

The Minyons Escoltes i Guies de Catalunya, a Catalan Scouting organization, undertook a study on the possibilities for Scout groups in Andorra in summer 2007. Activities were started in 2008 and were supervised by the European Scout Region. As the previous attempts were unsuccessful, in 2016 a group of young people again initiated scouting activities based in the old Glòria hotel, in the Plaça Major, Sant Julià de Lòria, with the aim of re-establishing scouting in Andorra.
