= Parochial Union of Ordino =

Defunct political party of Andorra

The Parochial Union of Ordino (Catalan: Unió Parroquial d'Ordino, UPd'O) was a local political party in Ordino, Andorra.

== History ==
The party first contested national elections in 1997, when it took part in parliamentary elections. The party did not participate in the national-level vote, but put forward candidates in the parish-level elections in alliance with the Liberal Union. The party won both seats in the Ordino provincial circumscription, with Simón Duró Coma and Josep Àngel Mortés Pons being elected to the General Council.

The party has not contested any national elections since 1997.
