= Julian Vila Coma =

Andorran diplomat

H.E. Julian Vila Coma

Permanent Representative to the United Nations for Andorra
- Incumbent
- Assumed office 3 May 2004

Personal details
- Born: Andorra

Julian Vila Coma is the Permanent Representative for the Principality of Andorra to the United Nations. His office was first confirmed when he presented his credentials to the Secretary-General of the United Nations on 3 May 2004.

He has spoken more than once at the UN on multilateral nuclear disarmament.
