= Human rights in Andorra =

Human Rights in Andorra are guaranteed under the Andorran constitution. The State Department considers Andorra to have few human rights concerns.

== Respect for the Integrity of the Person ==
The constitution and law prohibit Torture and Other Cruel, Inhuman, or Degrading Treatment or Punishment, arbitrary arrest and detention.

Andorra has no defense force or military. The national police, which have sole responsibility for internal security, are organized into four areas: public security, technical support, borders and traffic, and crime.

Police may legally detain persons for 48 hours without charging them with a crime. Warrants are required for arrest. The law does not provide individuals under arrest immediate access to an attorney. Legislation provides for legal assistance beginning 25 hours after the time of arrest. There is a system of bail. Lengthy pretrial detention was a problem, and the ombudsman has criticized it. Approximately 75 percent of lengthy detention cases involved foreigners. Pretrial detainees made up approximately 30 percent of the prison population.

The constitution and law provide for an independent judiciary, and the government generally respected this provision in practice. The judiciary includes the Magistrate's Court and the Court of Courts. Once sentencing is announced there is a 10-day period to present an appeal to the Magistrate's Court. Upon acceptance of appeal the report is sent to the Court of Courts where the two parties are requested to return within a 15-day period. If the appellant or a legal representative makes no physical appearance before the court within the 15-day period then the appeal is declared void. The highest judicial body is the five-member Supreme Council of Justice. The two princes, the head of government, the president of the parliament, and, collectively, members of the lower courts, appoint one member each.

The constitution and law provide for the right to a fair trial, and an independent judiciary generally enforced this right. Trials are public and defendants can request a jury. Defendants have the right to present evidence and consult with an attorney. Defendants have a presumption of innocence, and they have the right to appeal.

Andorra prohibits the imprisonment of political dissidents. The constitution and law prohibit Arbitrary Interference with Privacy, Family, Home, or Correspondence.

== Civil liberties ==
=== Freedom of speech and press ===
The constitution and law provide for freedom of speech and of the press. An independent press, an effective judiciary, and a functioning democratic political system are maintained.

=== Freedom of peaceful assembly and association ===
The constitution and law provide for the freedom of assembly and association, and the government generally respected these rights in practice.

=== Freedom of religion ===
The constitution and law provide for freedom of religion, and the government generally respected this right in practice. Under the constitution, the Roman Catholic Church and the state have a special relationship; however, the Catholic Church received no direct subsidies from the government.

There were no reports of anti-Semitic acts against the approximately 300-person Jewish community.

=== Freedom of movement within the country, foreign travel, emigration, and repatriation ===
The constitution and law provide for these rights, and the government generally respected them in practice.

The constitution and law prohibit forced exile, and the government did not employ it.

The law does not provide for the granting of asylum or refugee status in accordance with the 1951 UN Convention relating to the Status of Refugees and its 1967 protocol, and the government has not established a system for providing protection to refugees. The government did not grant refugee status or asylum; however, it cooperated with the Office of the UN High Commissioner for Refugees and other humanitarian organizations in assisting refugees. At the request of the Spanish government, the government accepted five Eritrean immigrants who were part of a group saved from a ship adrift in the Mediterranean Sea. The government said it accepted the group for humanitarian reasons.

== Political rights ==
The constitution and law provide citizens with the right to change their government peacefully, and citizens exercised this right in practice through periodic, free, and fair elections held on the basis of universal suffrage.

General Council elections in April 2005 were considered free and fair and allowed the conservative Liberal Party of Andorra to remain in power. Individuals and parties could freely declare their candidacy and stand for election.

There were eight women in the 28-seat General Council, and three women in the 11-seat cabinet.

There were no members of minorities in either the General Council or the cabinet.

There were no reports of government corruption during the year.

The law provides for public access to government information, and the government permitted access in practice for citizens and non-citizens, including foreign media.

== Governmental Attitude Regarding International and Nongovernmental Investigation of Alleged Violations of Human Rights ==
A number of domestic and international human rights groups generally operated without government restriction, investigating and publishing their findings on human rights cases. Government officials were cooperative and responsive to their views.

An ombudsman received and addressed complaints, some of which were against the government's policies. The ombudsman was free of government control, and the government was generally responsive to the ombudsman's recommendations. The ombudsman, who is elected by consensus of all political parties, is authorized to hear and investigate complaints by private citizens against government officials or agencies. The ombudsman advised the government to follow World Health Organization recommendations concerning work and residence permits for immigrants. The government's denial of permits to people with certain diseases, including those affected by HIV, is a practice that the ombudsman stated could violate human rights.

The Andorran International Women's Association (AIWA), Caritas, the Andorran Women's Association (AWA), and Women's Group formed a "platform for human rights" in January with the purpose of ensuring that human rights are adhered to in the country.

== Discrimination, societal abuse, and trafficking in persons ==
The constitution and law declare that all persons are equal before the law and prohibit discrimination on grounds of birth, race, gender, origin, opinions, or any other personal or social condition; however, the law grants several rights and privileges exclusively to citizens.

=== Women ===
Violence against women was a problem. According to the Ministry of Health, Welfare, and Family, violence against women increased during the year; the number of reports of physical abuse rose to approximately 110 cases. There is no specific law prohibiting domestic violence, although other laws may be applied in such cases. Victims of domestic violence could request help from the AIWA and the AWA, but rarely filed a complaint with the police for fear of reprisal. The two associations reported that some women complained about the treatment they received from police when they went to file a complaint. Authorities reported that the number of persons prosecuted for violence against women during the year increased, but they did not provide statistics. The government had a hotline and provided medical and psychological services to victims of domestic violence but did not have any shelters. The government and the AIWA placed abused women and their children in the private apartments of people who agreed to provide shelter to them. Caritas, a religious NGO, worked closely with the government and the AIWA on social issues.

The law prohibits rape, including spousal rape, which is punishable by up to 15 years' imprisonment. Authorities enforced the law effectively.

Prostitution is illegal and was not a problem.

The law does not prohibit sexual harassment; however, it was not considered a problem.

The law prohibits discrimination against women privately or professionally; however, the AWA reported that there were many cases of women dismissed from employment due to pregnancy. Women did not earn equal pay for equal work. Observers estimated that women earned 35 percent less than men for comparable work; this gap appeared to be decreasing slowly.

=== Children ===
The government was committed to children's welfare. Free, universal public education begins at age four and is compulsory until age 16. The government provides free nursery schools, although their number continued to be insufficient. Reportedly 100 percent of school-age children attended school. Secondary school was the maximum level of public school offered.

Health care is free, and boys and girls had equal access.

Although violence against children was a problem, according to the secretariat of state for the family, the number of cases was low, and the incidence of child abuse continued to fall during the year.

=== Trafficking in persons ===
The law does not prohibit trafficking in persons; however, there were no reports that persons were trafficked to, from, or within the country.

=== Persons with disabilities ===
The law prohibits discrimination against persons with disabilities in employment, education, access to health care, or in the provision of other state services, and the government enforced it effectively. Nevertheless, societal discrimination against persons with disabilities existed on a small scale, in the form of social and cultural barriers. Persons with disabilities also faced disadvantages in the labor market. The law mandates access to public buildings for persons with disabilities, and the government generally enforced this provision. An association for persons with disabilities operates in the principality.

=== National/racial/ethnic minorities ===
Some immigrant workers complained that although the law provides them the same labor rights as citizens, they were not treated the same in practice.

== Worker rights ==
The constitution allows workers to form and join trade unions of their choice without previous authorization or excessive requirements, and workers exercised these rights in practice. However, no further specific law has been developed to protect this right; thus workers are sometimes reluctant to admit to union membership, fearing retaliation by their employers.

The law allows unions to conduct their activities without interference, and the government respected this right in practice. The law does not specifically provide for collective bargaining. The minimum wage is determined by the consumer price index; the vast majority of employees are paid more than this. The law does not provide for the right to strike, and there were no strikes during the year. There are no export processing zones.

The law does not prohibit forced and compulsory labor, including by children; however, there were no reports that such practices occurred.

The law prohibits children under the age of 18 from working, except in very limited circumstances. The labor inspection office in the Ministry of Social Welfare, Public Health, and Labor effectively enforced child labor regulations.

The national minimum wage of $8.51 (6.50 euros) per hour, and $1,080 (825 euros) per month did not provide a decent standard of living for a worker and family. Wages increased at a slower pace than housing and lodging costs. The labor inspection office enforced the minimum wage effectively. The law limits the workweek to 40 hours, although employers may require up to 66 hours per month and 426 hours per year overtime from workers. The law provides for premium pay for overtime. There is a required rest period every day. The standard workday is eight hours; workers may work up to three overtime hours per day or 15 hours per week.

The labor inspection service sets occupational health and safety standards and effectively enforced them. During the year the labor inspection service received more than 200 complaints against companies for violating labor regulations, and had the authority to levy sanctions and fines against such companies. Although the law authorizes employees to refuse certain tasks if their employers do not provide the necessary level of protection, it does not provide workers the right to remove themselves from dangerous work situations without jeopardizing their continued employment. The number of accidents at work has been rising for a number of years; from January to October there were 5,395 accidents.

== See also ==
- LGBT rights in Andorra
