= Culture of Andorra =

Andorra is essentially Catalan-speaking. The country has contributed significantly to Catalan heritage.

== Language and literature ==
The official and historic language is Catalan. Thus the culture is Catalan, with its own specificity.

Two writers well known in Catalonia and the region, Michele Gazier and Ramon Villero, both come from Andorra. In addition, Ricard Fiter, another well-known writer, not only comes from Andorra, but also serves as the Principality's ombudsman. Yet the tradition of writing in Andorra dates further back than the 20th century; Antoni Fiter i Rossell, from the parish of Ordino, wrote a history book of his lands called Digest manual de las valls neutras de Andorra in 1748, describing the feudal historical and legal setting of Andorra.

== Music ==
Given the fondness of the Catalans for music, it may not be surprising to hear that Andorra has a Chamber Orchestra directed by the violinist Gérard Claret. It also stages an international singing contest supported by the Spanish singer Montserrat Caballé. In 2004, Andorra participated in the Eurovision Song Contest for the first time. This attracted media attention from Catalonia, since it was the first song to be sung in Catalan. The song was eliminated in the semi-finals, and the 2005 and 2006 entries also met the same fate. In 2009, they were eliminated in the semi-finals as well.

== Dance ==
Typical dances, such as the marratxa and the contrapàs, are especially popular at feasts. Among famous feasts are the one honoring Sant Jordi, when books and roses are given as presents; the People's feast, celebrating Saint John and the summer solstice, and the feast of Saint Stephen (Sant Esteve), patron saint of Andorra la Vella. Andorrans tend to celebrate their feasts loudly and gleefully.

== Media ==
Andorra's constitution provides for full freedom of the media. There are two daily newspapers published in the principality, Diari d'Andorra and El Periòdic d'Andorra. Television services are broadcast by the public Ràdio i Televisió d'Andorra. Apart from the public Radio nacional d'Andorra, there is also the commercial radio station called Radio Valira.

== See also ==
- List of regional characteristics of Romanesque churches
- Sport in Andorra
