= Catholic Church in Andorra =

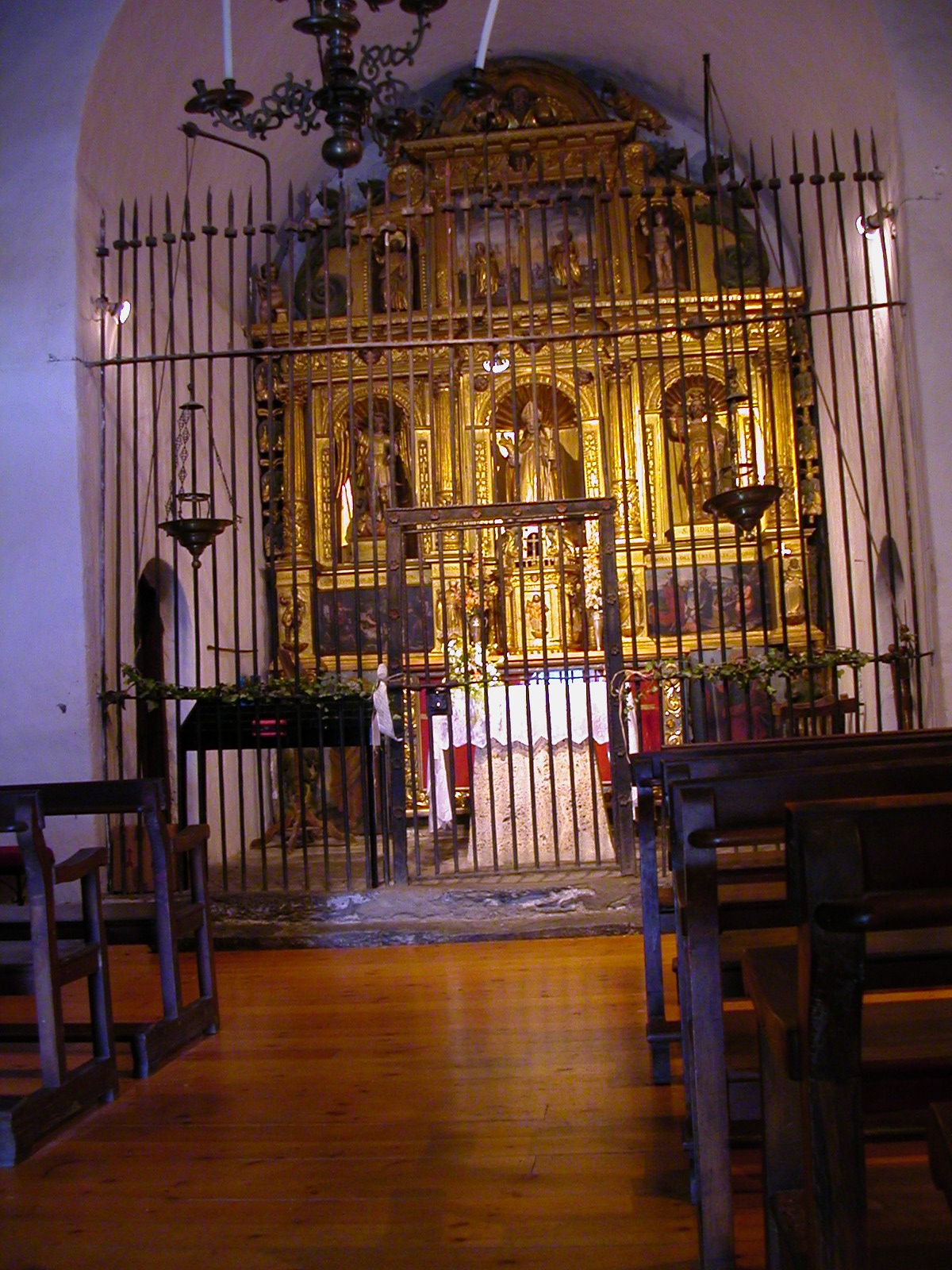
Church of St Martin, Ordino

The Catholic Church in Andorra is part of the worldwide Catholic Church, under the spiritual leadership of the Pope in Rome.

There are about 60,000 Catholics in Andorra, making up 88% of the total population, and the country forms part of the Spanish Diocese of Urgell, whose bishop is also one of the country's Co-Princes.

Few official statistics are available on religion; estimates of the Catholic population in 2020 range from 89.5% and 99.21%.

== Organization ==
The country has never had a diocese and belongs to the Diocese of Urgell, whose bishop, together with the President of the French Republic, shares the role of head of state of the tiny country.

From a historical point of view Andorra was evangelized through the bishopric of Urgell, in the reign of St. Just, in the mid-sixth century.

The principality is divided into seven parishes: Canillo, Encamp, Ordino, La Massana, Andorra la Vella, Sant Julia de Loria and Escaldes-Engordany.

Càritas Andorrana is the social welfare organisation of the Andorran Catholic Church.

== Apostolic Nunciature ==
The apostolic nunciature in Andorra was established on 16 June 1995. The Apostolic Nuncio is also nuncio in Spain and lives in Madrid.

The current Apostolic Nuncio is the Archbishop Bernardito Auza, appointed by Pope Francis on 1 October 2019.

== See also ==
- Freedom of religion in Andorra
- Catholic Church by country
