= List of diplomatic missions of Andorra =

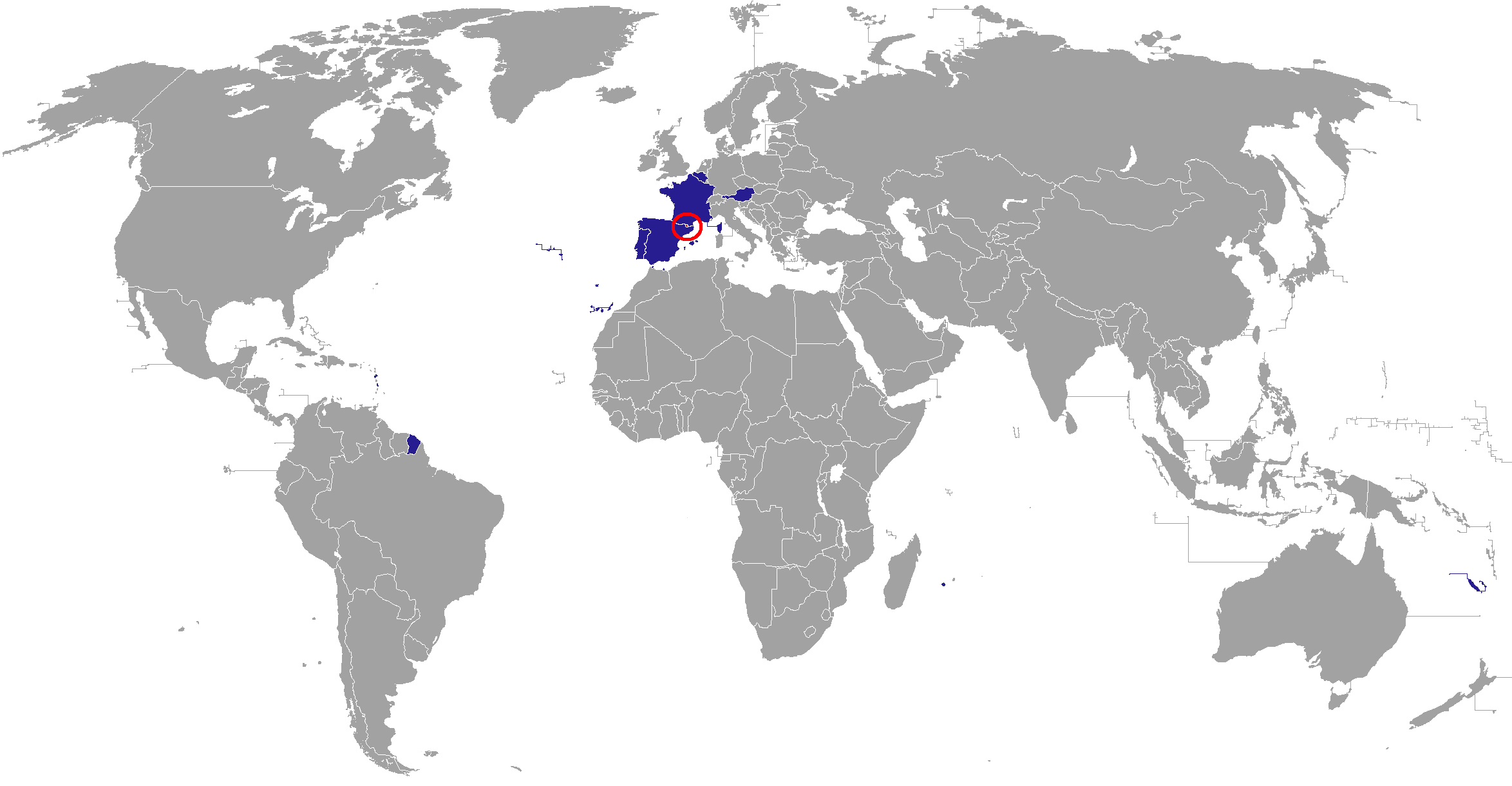
Diplomatic missions of Andorra

This is a list of diplomatic missions of Andorra. Andorra has a limited number of diplomatic missions, with most actual embassies located in neighbouring European countries, and some missions also accredited to multilateral organisations also responsible to the hosted countries. Its mission in Brussels encompasses bilateral relations with the European Union, the Benelux countries, and Germany. The Andorran mission in New York City comprises the bilateral relations with the United States, Canada and Mexico, as well as represents Andorra at the UN.

== Current missions ==
=== Europe ===
Host country	Host city	Mission	Concurrent accreditation	Ref.
Austria	Vienna	Embassy	Countries: Germany; Hungary; Slovakia; International Organizations: Comprehensive Nuclear-Test-Ban Treaty Organization; Organization for Security and Co-operation in Europe; United Nations	
Belgium	Brussels	Embassy	Countries: Belize; Luxembourg; Netherlands; International Organizations: European Union	
France	Paris	Embassy	Countries: Monaco; International Organizations: Francophonie; UNESCO	
Portugal	Lisbon	Embassy	International Organizations: Community of Portuguese Language Countries (Note: Accredited as an observer mission.)	
Spain	Madrid	Embassy	International Organizations: Ibero-American General Secretariat	

=== Multilateral organizations ===
Organization	Host city	Host country	Mission	Concurrent accreditation	Ref.
Council of Europe	Strasbourg	France	Permanent Representative		
United Nations	Geneva	Switzerland	Permanent Mission	International Organizations: World Trade Organization	
United Nations	New York City	United States	Permanent Mission	Countries: Canada; Guatemala; Mexico; United States	

== Gallery ==
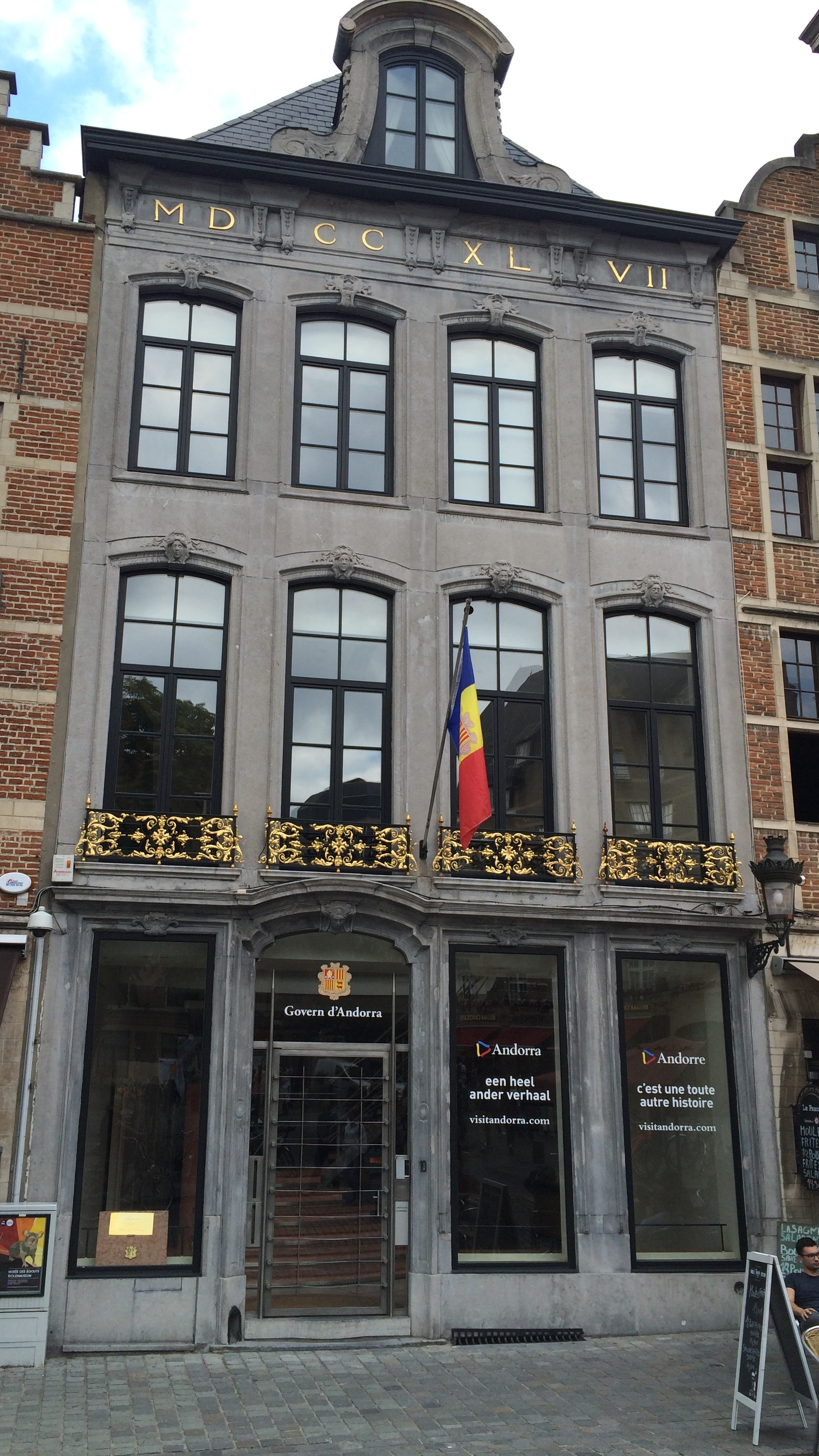
Embassy in Brussels

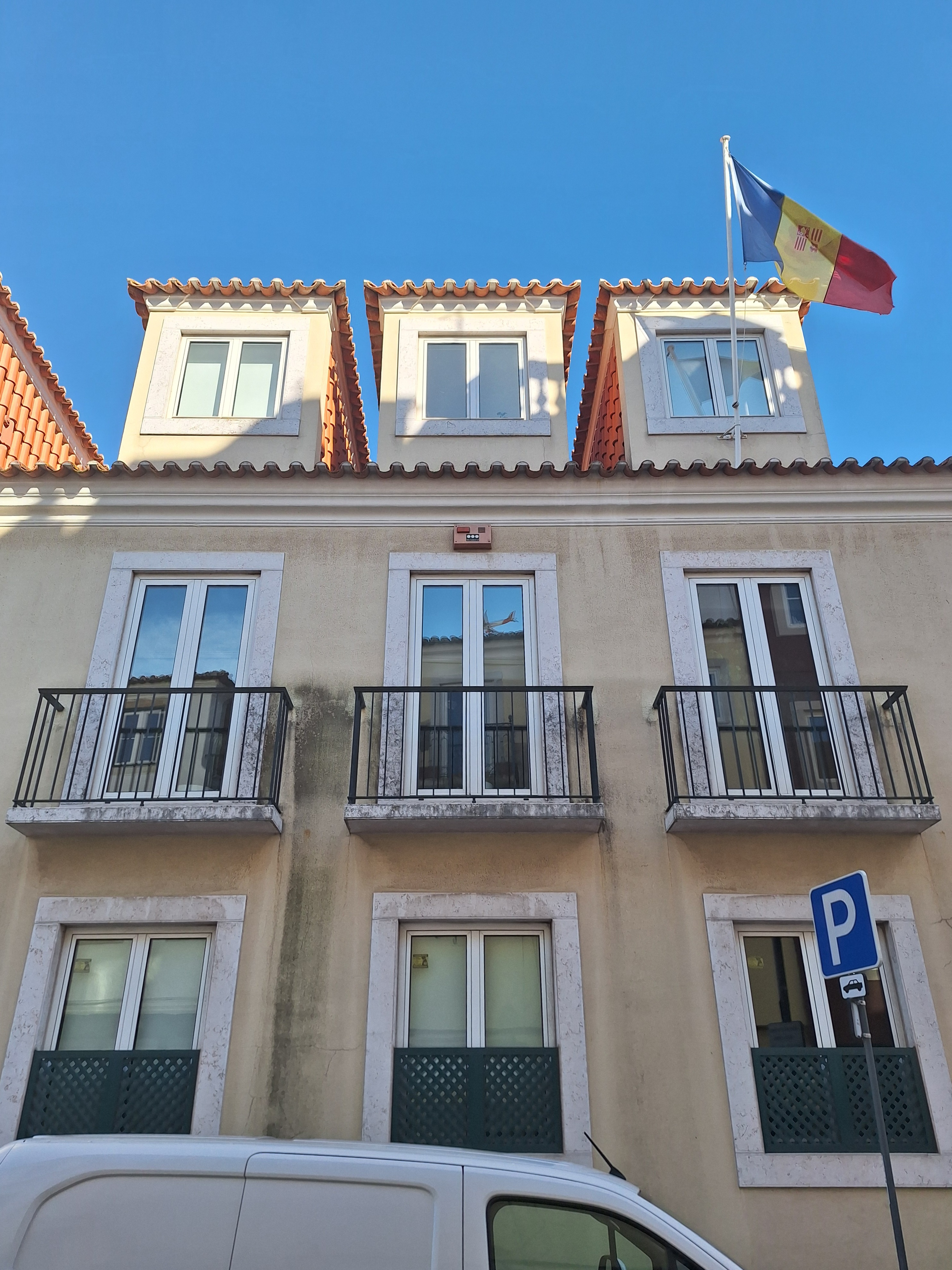
Embassy in Lisbon

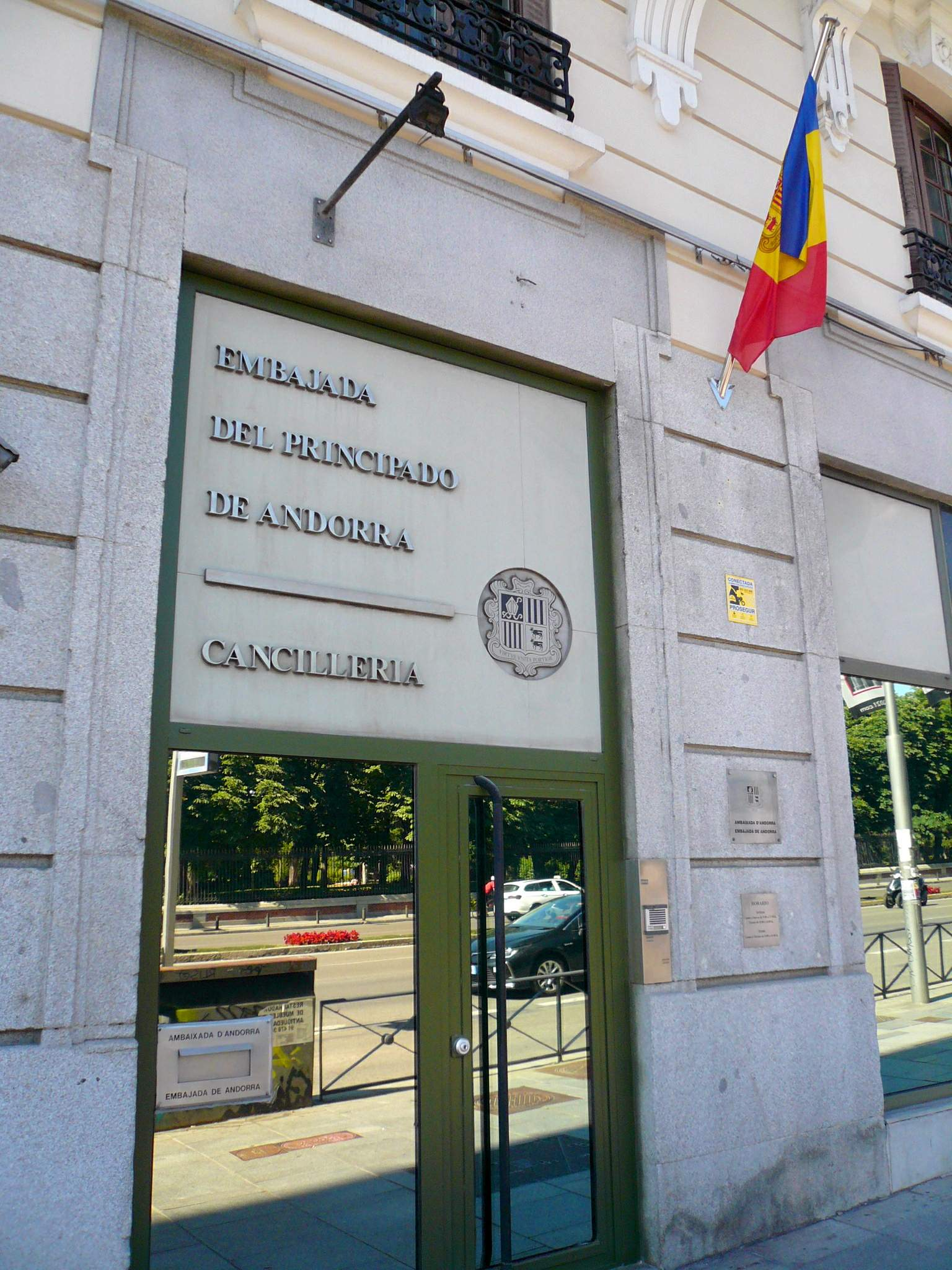
Embassy in Madrid

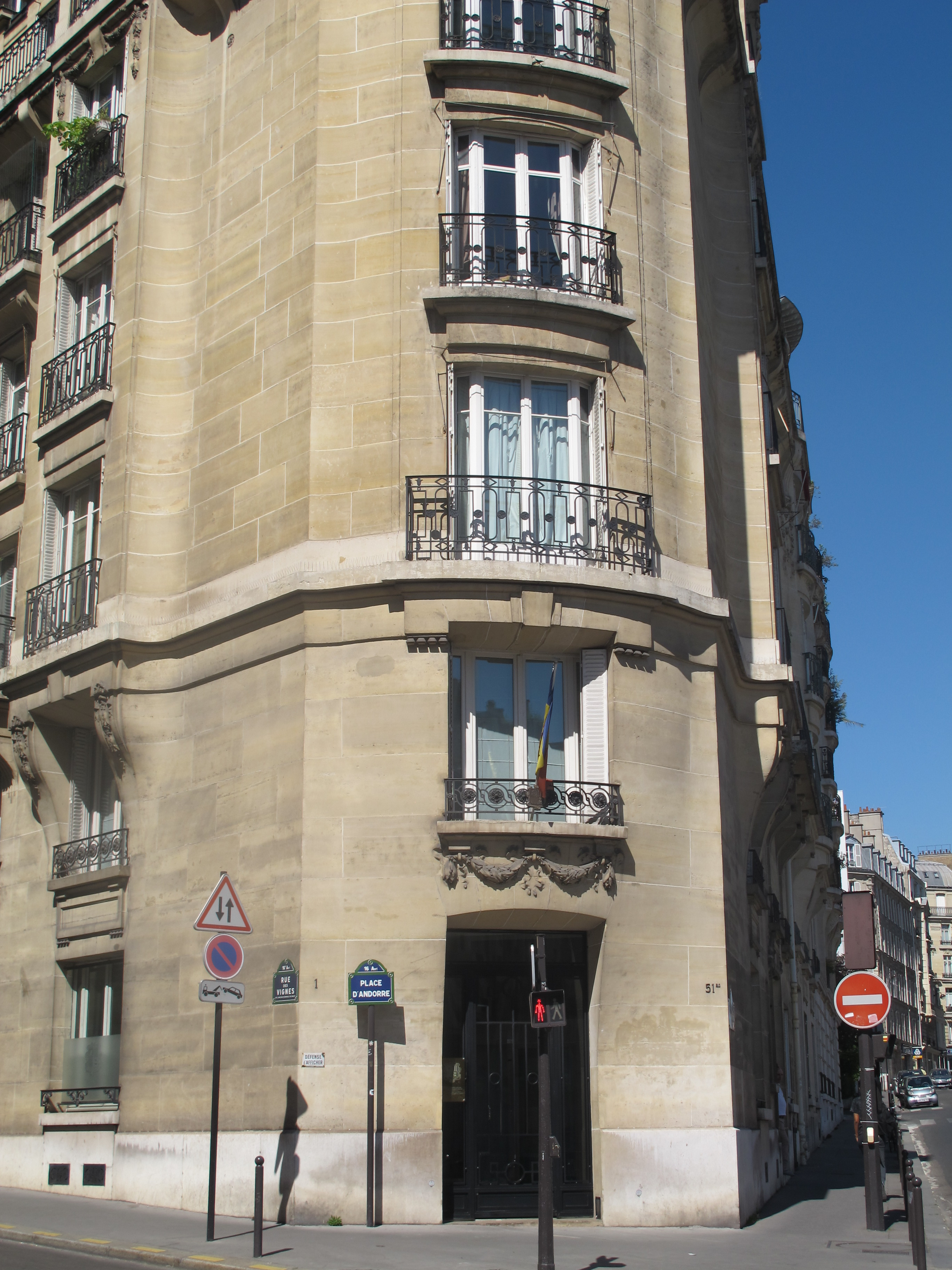
Embassy in Paris

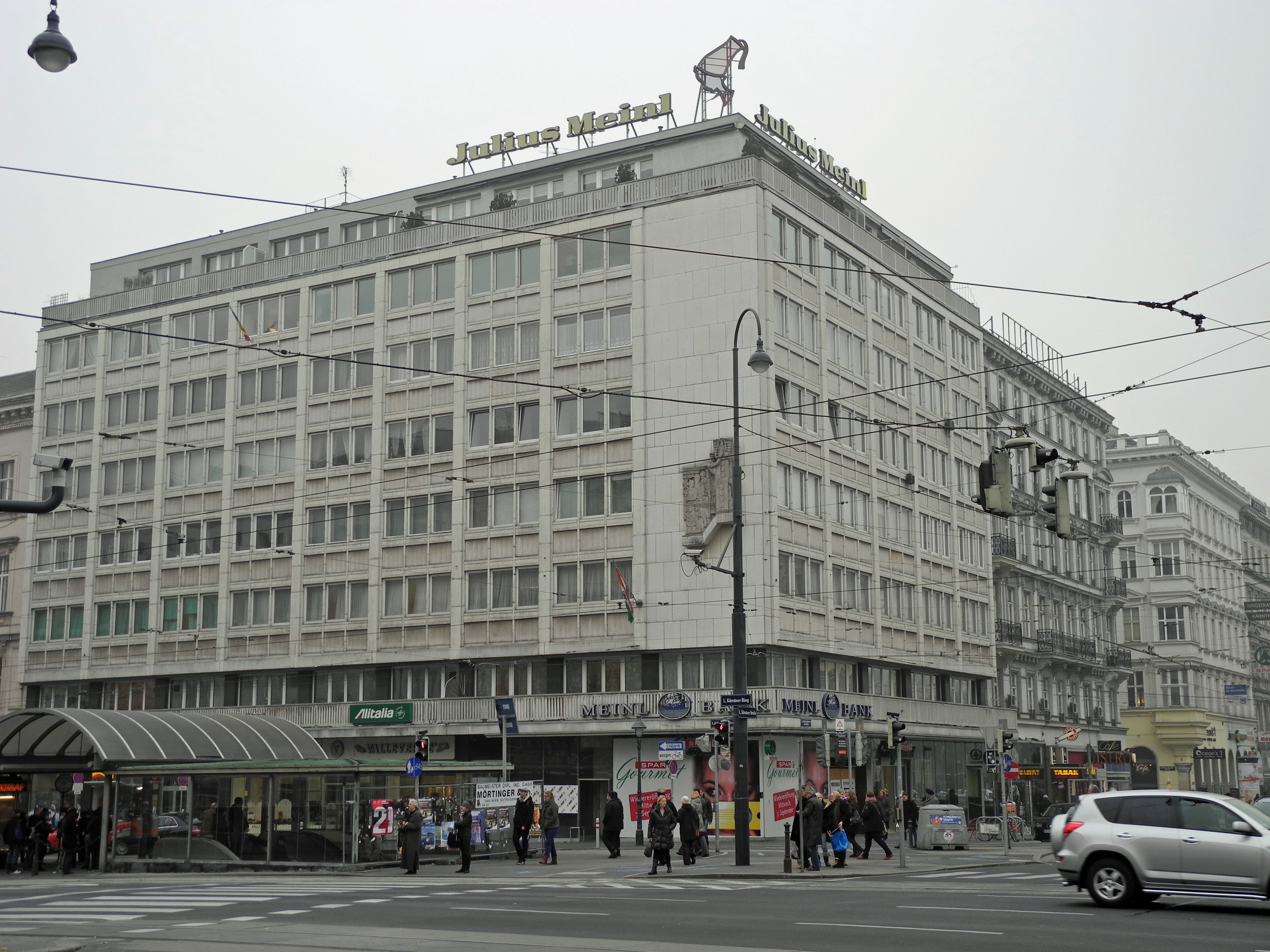
Building hosting the Embassy in Vienna

== See also ==
- Foreign relations of Andorra
- List of diplomatic missions in Andorra
