= Music of Andorra =

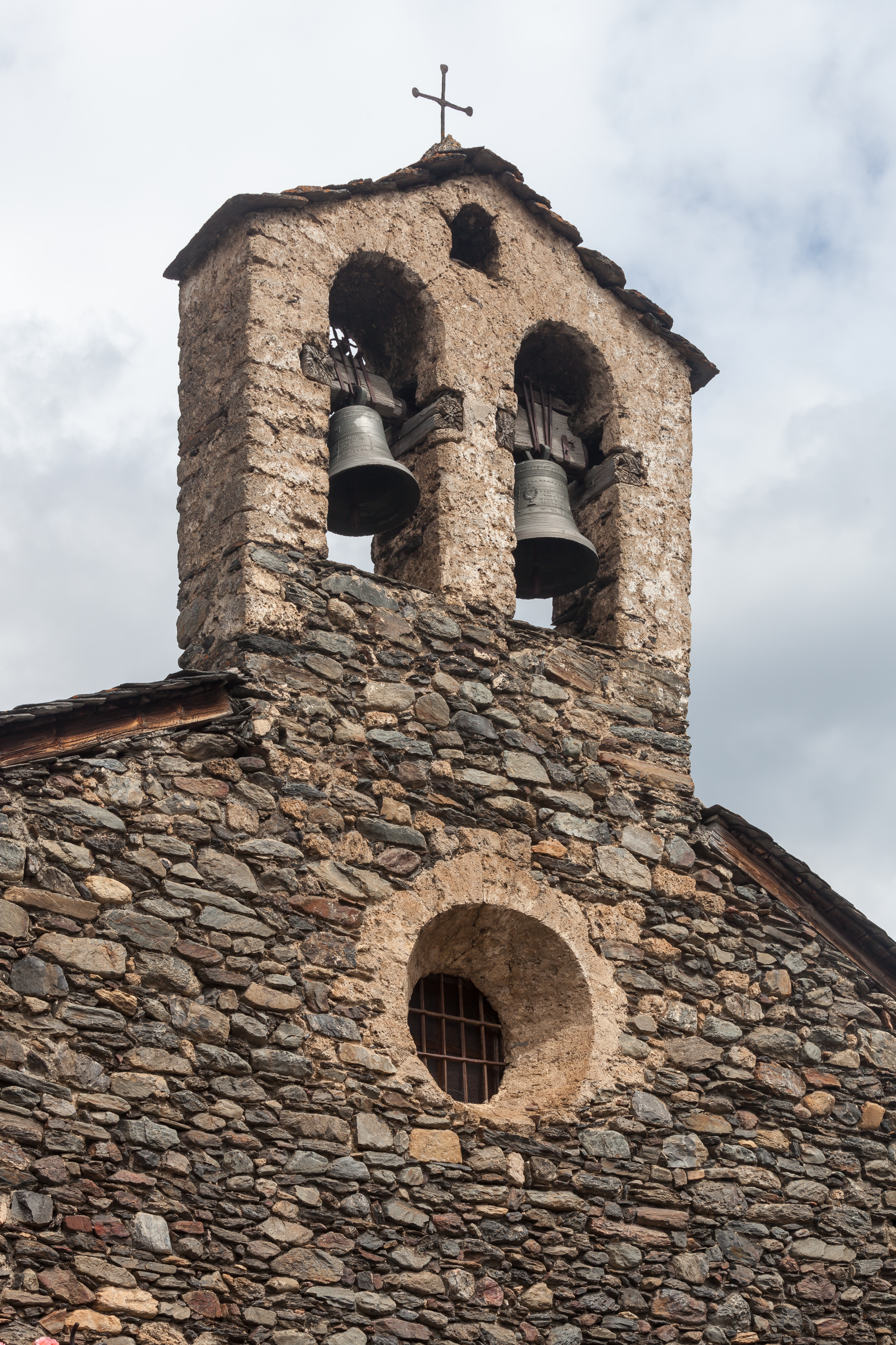
Bell tower of the church of Sant Serní de Llorts. Ordino. Andorra

The Principality of Andorra is home to folk dances like the contrapàs and marratxa, which survive in Sant Julià de Lòria especially. Andorran folk music has similarities to the music in nearby regions of France and Spain, but is especially Catalan in character, especially in the presence of dances like the sardana. Other Andorran folk dances include contrapàs in Andorra la Vella and Saint Anne's dance in Escaldes-Engordany.

Radio Nacional d’Andorra runs both Radio Andorra and the music station Andorra Música.

Music festivals in Andorra include the ChamJam Music Festival, Ordino and the jazz Escaldes-Engordany International Jazz Festival. Violinist Gérard Claret is the director of the Young National Orchestra of Cambra d'Andorra.

The national anthem of Andorra is "El Gran Carlemany" (Great Charlemagne). It was adopted on 8 September 1914, the feast day of Andorra's patron saint, the Virgin of Meritxell.

The progressive metal band Persefone is one of the most notable music groups to originate from Andorra.

== Eurovision ==
Andorra (through national broadcaster RTVA) has participated in the Eurovision Song Contest on only six occasions, from 2004 until 2009. In 2004, Spaniard Marta Roure's "Jugarem A Estimar-Nos" was the first Catalan language entrant to the Eurovision Song Contest, and Andorra remains the only participating country presenting songs in Catalan. Andorra did not progress beyond the semi-finals in any of its six attempts; its best result was in 2007, when punk band Anonymous and the song "Salvem el món" finished 12th among 28 countries in the semi-final. Andorra decided to withdraw from the 2010 edition due to lack of funding from the TV station's shareholders and due to spending cuts within the network, and has not returned.
