= Languages of Andorra =

- Official: Catalan
- Foreign: Spanish and French
- Signed: Catalan Sign Language Spanish Sign Language French Sign Language
- Keyboard layout: Andorra uses the Spaniard QWERTY layout

The national language of Andorra is Catalan, a Romance language in the Western Romance group, spoken by over 9 million people in nearby regions of Spain and France. While Catalan is the only official language, Spanish is particularly widespread, and French and Portuguese are also commonly spoken due to immigration and geographic proximity. Most residents of Andorra are multilingual, typically speaking Catalan and their native language, as a significant portion of the population was born outside the country.

Language	At home			Outside home	
Language	2014	2018	2022	2018	2022
Catalan	39.5%	35.7%	44%	55.2%	63.7%
Spanish	43.8%	43.2%	40.3%	37.1%	48.6%
Portuguese	18.6%	17.1%	13.5%	3.8%	6.6%
French	9.7%	8.9%	10%	2.2%	5.7%
Others	9%	6.8%	9.8%	1.5% - 10%	4.9%
Source: Coneixements i Usos Lingüístics de la Població d'Andorra (1995–2022)

== Catalan ==
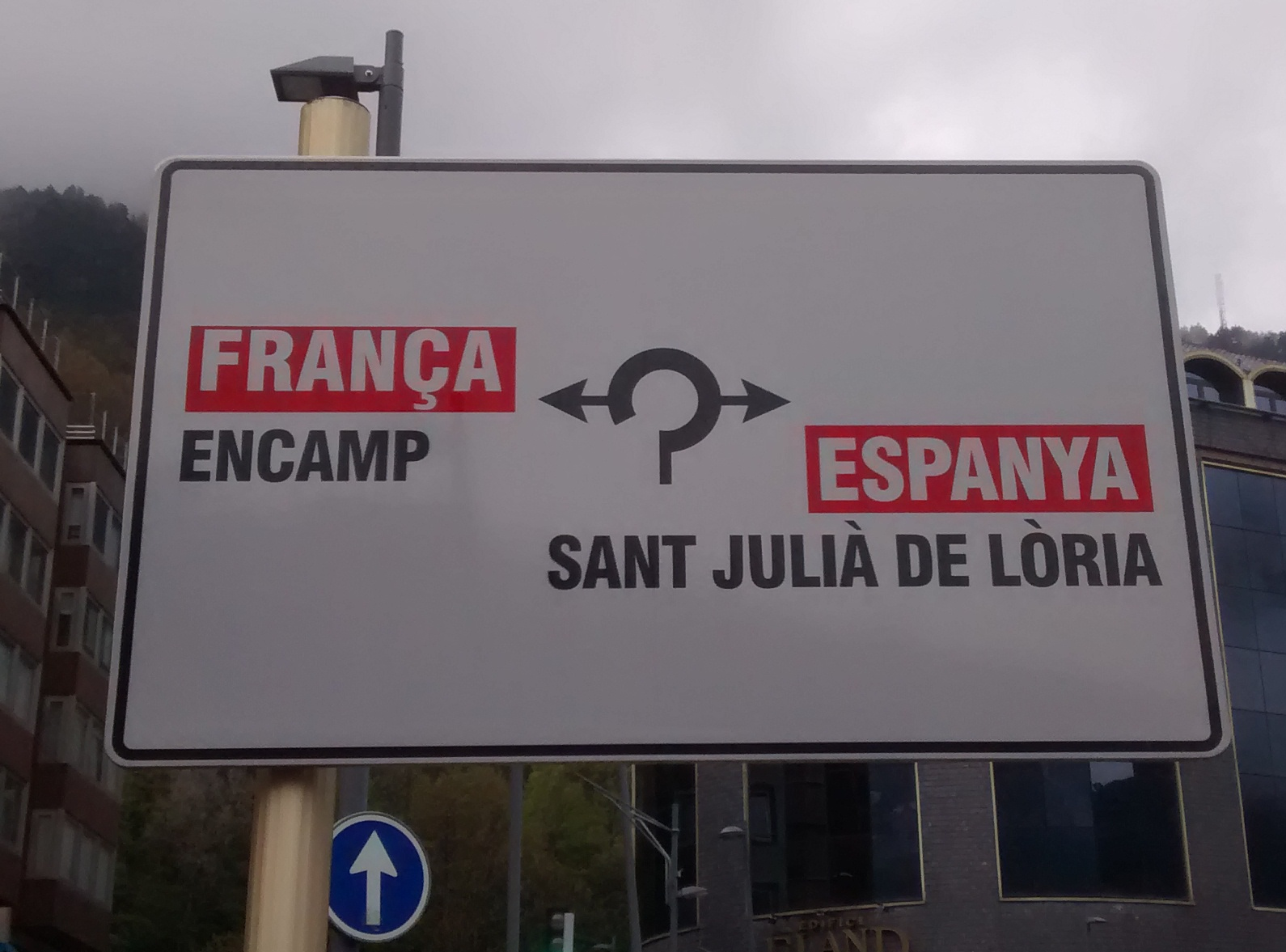
Most signage in Andorra is in Catalan

Catalan is the only official language of Andorra. It is also the historical and traditional language of the country used by government, television, radio, and other national media and is the main language of all the people living in the territory of Andorran nationality, who constitute 44% of the total population. The local dialect is Northwestern Catalan.

The Government of Andorra has recently begun enforcing the learning and use of the language within the immigrant labour force as a means to fully apply the constitution and overcome the issue of people living in a country without knowing its official language. Despite heavy tourism from Spanish-speakers from Spain, both public and private signage in Andorra is mostly monolingual in Catalan.

Andorra is the only country in which Catalan is the sole official language and the only country in which Catalan has official status in all of its territory.

== Spanish ==
Since then, Spanish has become the second most used language of the population living in the country, and moreover is the dominant language of communication amongst people of different linguistic backgrounds, thus triggering recent government efforts to promote more general and universal use of Catalan.

== Portuguese ==
In the past there was sizeable Portuguese immigration to Andorra; the number of Portuguese nationals with residence in the country peaked in 2008, with 13,794 people, that is, 16.3% of the total population.

== French ==
It is the main language of communication next to Catalan in Pas de la Casa on the French border.
