= Telecommunications in Andorra =

The telephone system in Andorra, including mobile, data and Internet is operated exclusively by the Andorran national telecommunications company, Andorra Telecom, formerly known as Servei de Telecomunicacions d'Andorra (STA). The same company is also responsible for managing the technical infrastructure and national broadcasting networks for radio and television, both analogue and digital.

At one time, Andorra shared the country code of France (+33), and also had a special routing code for calls from Spain, but now has its own country calling code, 376.

== Telephone ==
Telephones - main lines in use: 37,200 (2007)
country comparison to the world: 171

Telephones - mobile cellular: 68,500 (2007)
country comparison to the world: 187

Telephone system:
domestic: modern system with microwave radio relay connections between exchanges
international: landline circuits to France and Spain

== Radio ==
Radio broadcast stations: AM 0, FM 1, shortwave 0 (easy access to radio and television broadcasts originating in France and Spain) (2007)

There are two abandoned high power mediumwave broadcasting facilities, situated at Encamp and on Pic Blanc.

Radios: 16,000 (1997)

== Television ==
Television broadcast stations: 1 (2007)

Televisions: 27,000 (1997)

As announced on 25 September 2007 all analogue transmissions ceased. Television services are now provided by Televisió Digital Terrestre (TDT), which as well as broadcasting the one Andorran channel, broadcasts channels from Spain and France.

== Internet ==
Internet access is available only through the national telephone company, Andorra Telecom (formerly STA). Access was first provided in the 1990s by dial-up, but this has since been mostly replaced throughout the country by ADSL at a fixed speed of 2 Mbit/s, and in metropolitan areas of the country by fibre to the home at a fixed speed of 100 Mbit/s. The average cost of a high-speed internet connection is €35.35. The whole country was to have Fibre-Optic to the Home at a minimum speed of 100 Mbit/s by 2010, and the availability was complete in June 2012 although actual available bandwidth to the end user never exceeds 10 Mbit/s.

Internet service providers (ISPs): 1

Internet hosts: 23,368 (2008)
country comparison to the world: 90

Internet users: 58,900 (2007)
country comparison to the world: 161

Country codes: AD (1997)

Country calling code: 376
