= Andbank =

Universal bank based in Andorra

Andbank (Andorra Banc Agrícol Reig)

- Type: Private Company
- Industry: Banking
- Founded: 1930; 96 years ago as Banc Agrícol i Comercial d’Andorra
- Headquarters: Andorra La Vella, Andorra
- Key people: Manel Cerqueda Donadeu; Oriol Ribas Duró; Ricard Tubau Roca
- Operating income: €256 million (2016)
- Net income: €61 million (2016)
- AUM: €21,989 million (2016)
- Total assets: €4,989million (2016)
- Number of employees: 1142 (2016)
- Website: www.andbank.com

Andbank is a universal bank based in Andorra providing retail, private and corporate banking services in Andorra and internationally.

== History ==
Andbank was created in August 2001 as a result of the merger between Banc Agrícol i Comercial d’Andorra (that was founded in 1930) and Banca Reig (founded in 1956).

== Criticism ==
Following Russia's invasion of Ukraine in 2022, Andbank continues its existing operations in the country.

== Organizational structure ==
The firm is privately owned by the Cerqueda and Ribas families. It is directed by a team of independent professionals.

Andbank’s Board of Directors is composed of the following individuals:

- Oscar Ribas Reig, Honorary Chairman
- Manuel Cerqueda Donadeu, Chairman
- Oriol Ribas Duró, Deputy
- German Castejón Fernández, Director
- Manuel Cerqueda Diez, Director representing Cerqueda Donadeu, S.A.
- Jorge Maortua, Director representing Reig Finances S.A.U.
- Manuel Ros Gener, Director
- Xavier Santamaria Mas, Director
- Jaume Serra Serra, Director
- Josep Vicens Torradas, Director representing Inversion, Gestions i Estudis, S.A.U.
- Jacobo Baltar García Peñuela, Secretary General
- Ricard Tubau Roca, CEO

== Subsidiaries ==
Andbank has a network of forty subsidiaries in Europe, America, and Asia, including:

- Andbank Monaco SAM (Monaco)
- Andbank Luxembourg S.A. (Luxembourg)
- Andbanc Wealth Management, LLC (Miami, United States)
- Andbanc Brokerage, LLC (Miami, United States)
- Andbanc Advisory, LLC (Miami, United States)
- Andbank (Panamá) S.A. (Panama)
- Andbank (Bahamas) Limited (Bahamas)
- AND PB Financial Services, S.A. (Uruguay)
- Quest Capital Advisers Agente de Valores, S.A. (Uruguay)
- Columbus de Mexico, S.A. de CV (Mexico)
- Banco Andbank (Brasil), S.A. (Brazil)
- Andbank España S.A.U. (Spain)
- Andbank Wealth Management SGIIC S.A.U. (Spain)
- Medpatrimonia Invest S.L. (Spain)
- Sigma Portfolio Management (Israel)

== See also ==
- List of banks in Andorra
