= List of diplomatic missions in Andorra =

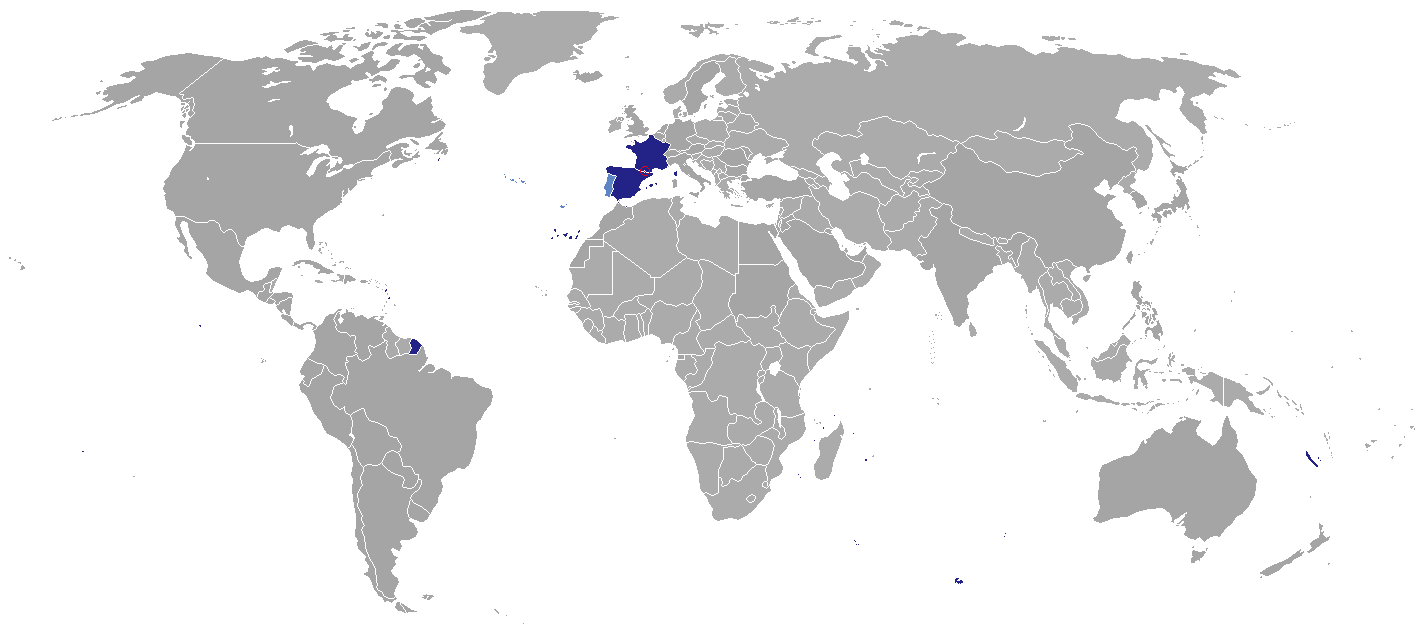
Diplomatic missions in Andorra

This article lists diplomatic missions to the Principality of Andorra. Andorra hosts two embassies in its capital of Andorra la Vella. Some countries accredit an ambassador resident in Paris or Madrid, but conduct day-to-day relations and provide consular services from Consulates General in Barcelona or by resident Honorary Consuls in Andorra.

== Diplomatic missions in Andorra la Vella ==
=== Embassies ===
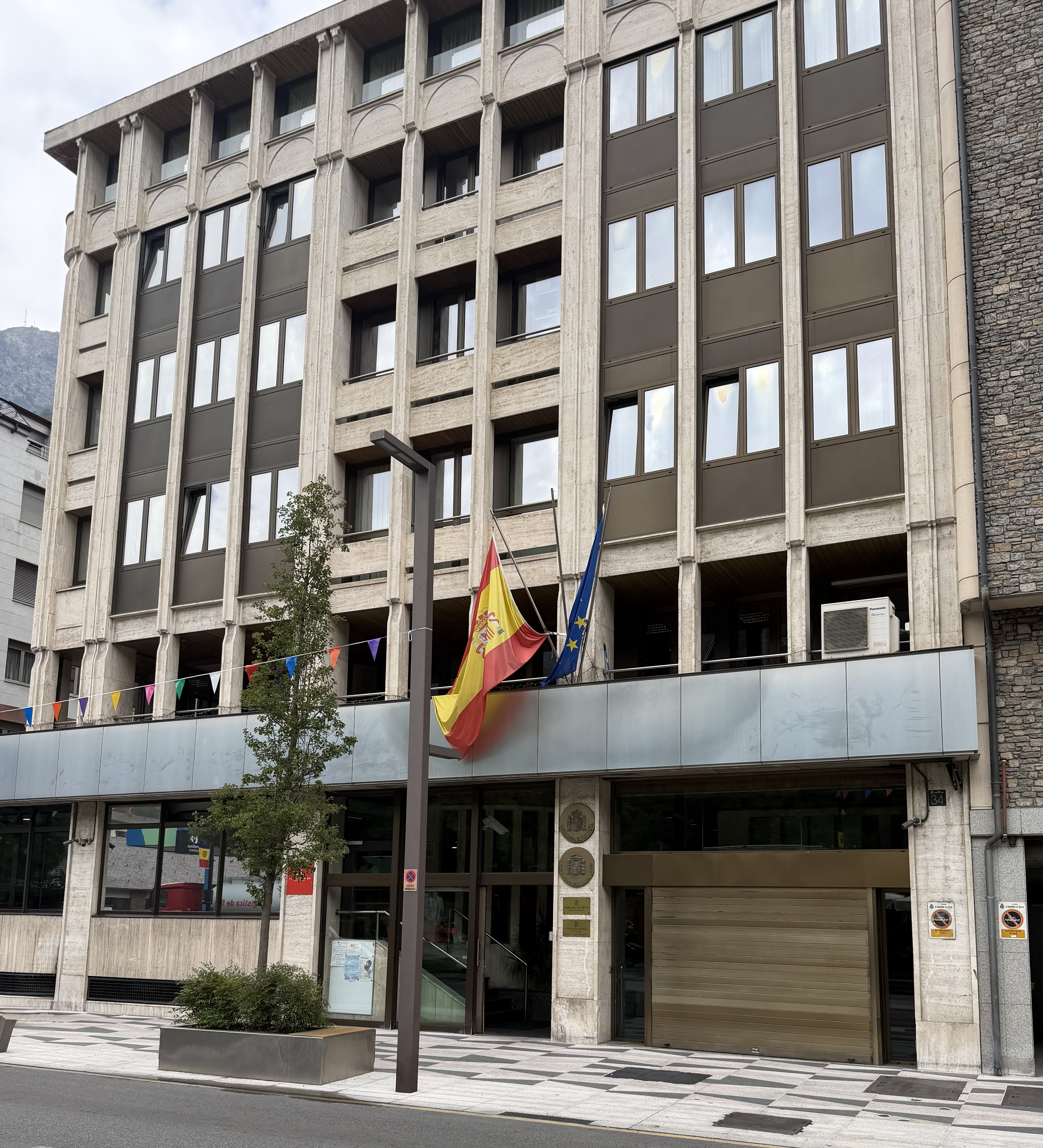
Embassy of Spain in Andorra la Vella

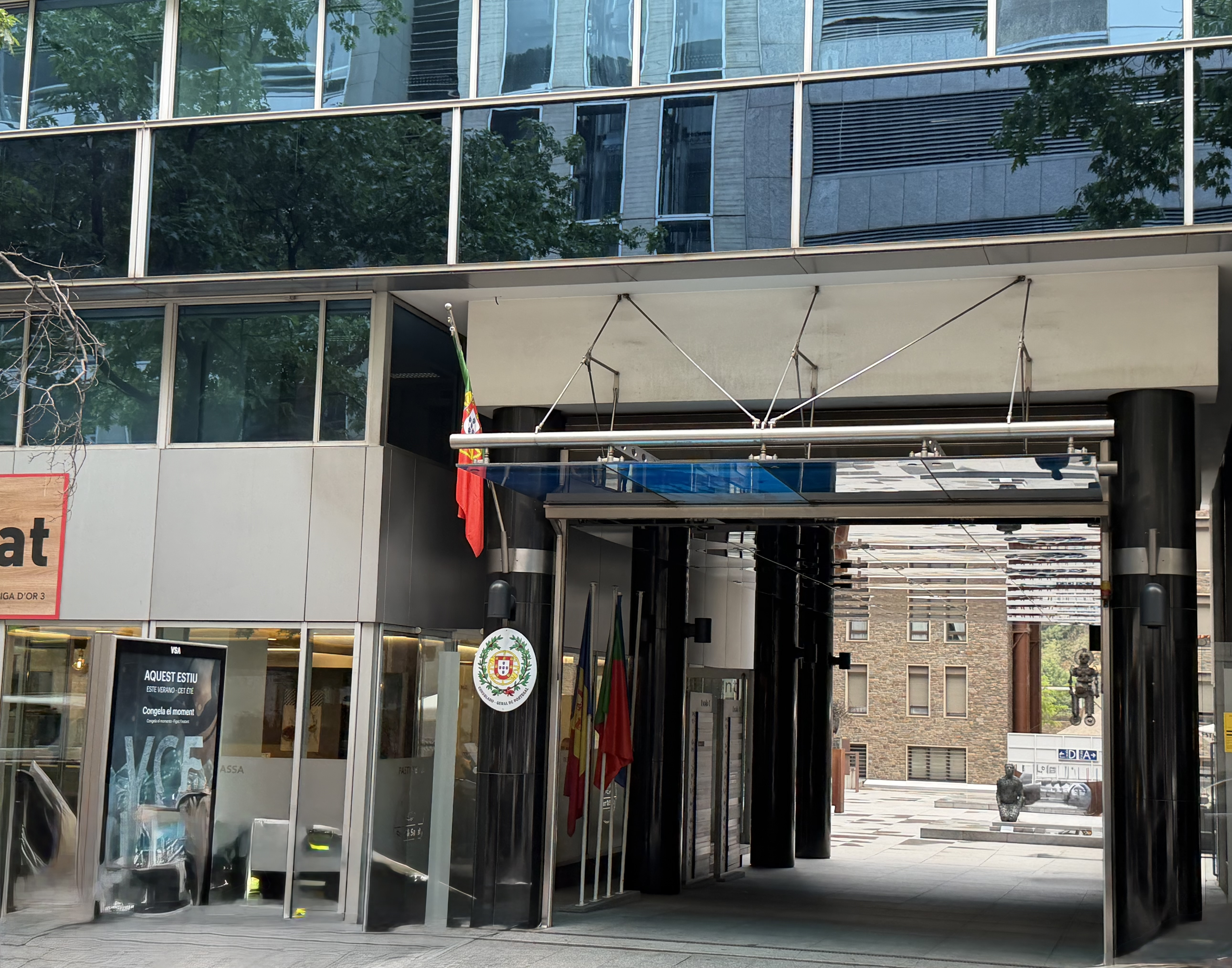
Consulate-General of Portugal in Andorra la Vella

- France
- Spain

=== Consulate-General ===
- Portugal

=== Other missions or delegations ===
- Catalonia (Delegation)

== Consulates ==
=== Consulates-General ===
All are located in Barcelona.

- Argentina
- Belgium
- Colombia
- Costa Rica
- Germany
- Hungary
- Ireland
- Italy
- Luxembourg
- Philippines
- Sweden
- Switzerland
- United Kingdom
- United States
- Venezuela

== Non-resident embassies ==
All are in Madrid unless another location is stated.

- Afghanistan
- Albania
- Algeria (Paris)
- Angola
- Argentina
- Armenia (Paris)
- Australia
- Austria
- Azerbaijan
- Bahamas (London)
- Bahrain (Paris)
- Bangladesh
- Belgium
- Benin (Paris)
- Bhutan (Brussels)
- Bosnia and Herzegovina (Paris)
- Botswana (Brussels)
- Brazil
- Bulgaria
- Cambodia (Paris)
- Canada
- Chile
- China
- Colombia
- Croatia
- Cuba
- Cyprus (Paris)
- Czechia
- Congo-Brazzaville (Paris)
- Congo-Kinshasa
- Denmark
- Dominican Republic
- Egypt
- El Salvador
- Estonia
- Eswatini (Brussels)
- Ethiopia (Paris)
- Finland
- Gambia
- Germany
- Ghana
- Greece
- Guatemala
- Guinea
- Guinea-Bissau (Paris)
- Holy See
- Honduras
- Hungary
- Iceland
- India
- Indonesia (Paris)
- Iran
- Iraq
- Ireland
- Israel
- Italy
- Japan (Paris)
- Jordan
- Kazakhstan
- Kenya
- Kosovo (Paris)
- Kuwait
- Kyrgyzstan (Brussels)
- Laos (Paris)
- Latvia
- Lebanon (Paris)
- Lesotho (London)
- Liberia (Paris)
- Libya
- Liechtenstein (Brussels)
- Lithuania
- Luxembourg
- Madagascar
- Malawi (Brussels)
- Malaysia
- Maldives (London)
- Malta (Valletta)
- Mauritania (Paris)
- Mexico
- Mongolia
- Montenegro
- Morocco (Paris)
- Mozambique
- Myanmar (Paris)
- Netherlands (Paris)
- Nepal (Paris)
- New Zealand
- Nicaragua (Paris)
- Nigeria
- North Korea
- Norway
- Oman
- Pakistan
- Panama
- Paraguay
- Peru
- Philippines
- Poland
- Portugal
- Qatar (Paris)
- Romania
- Russia
- San Marino (San Marino)
- Saudi Arabia
- Senegal (Paris)
- Serbia
- Seychelles (Paris)
- Sierra Leone (London)
- Singapore (Paris)
- Slovakia
- Slovenia
- Somalia (Paris)
- South Africa
- South Korea
- Sudan
- Sweden
- Tajikistan (Paris)
- Togo (Paris)
- Tonga (London)
- Thailand
- Tunisia
- Turkey
- Turkmenistan (Paris)
- Ukraine
- United Arab Emirates
- United Kingdom
- United States
- Uruguay
- Uzbekistan
- Vanuatu (Brussels)
- Venezuela (Paris)
- Vietnam (Paris)
- Yemen
- Zambia (Paris)
- Zimbabwe (Paris)

== See also ==
- Foreign relations of Andorra
- List of diplomatic missions of Andorra
