= Public holidays in Andorra =

This is a list of holidays in Andorra.

Date	English name	Local name
1 January	New Year's	Any nou
6 January	Epiphany	Reis
Variable	Carnival	Carnaval
14 March	Constitution Day	Dia de la Constitució
Variable	Good Friday	Divendres Sant
Variable	Easter Monday	Dilluns de Pasqua
1 May	Labour Day	Festa del Treball
Variable	Whit Monday	Dilluns de Pentecosta
15 August	Assumption Day	Assumpció
8 September	National Day	Mare de Déu de Meritxell
1 November	All Saints' Day	Tots Sants
8 December	Immaculate Conception	Immaculada Concepció
25 December	Christmas Day	Nadal
26 December	Saint Stephen's Day	Sant Esteve

Besides, seven parishes in Andorra holds their annual festivals or carnivals. These dates are public holidays in such parishes.

Date	Name	Holding parish
4–6 August	Andorra la Vella Annual Festival	Andorra la Vella
21–23 July	Canillo Annual Festival	Canillo
15–16 August	Encamp Annual Festival	Encamp
25–26 July	Escaldes–Engordany Annual Festival	Escaldes-Engordany
15 August – 16 August	La Massana Annual Festival	La Massana
15 August – 16 August	Ordino Annual Festival	Ordino
27–30 July	Sant Julià de Lòria Annual Festival	Sant Julià de Lòria
