= Andorra–United States relations =

- Andorra: United States

Diplomatic mission
- Embassy based in New York City: Embassy based in Madrid, Spain

Envoy
- Joan Forner Rovira: Benjamin Lėon, Jr.

Andorra–United States relations refer to the bilateral relations between Andorra and the United States.

== History ==
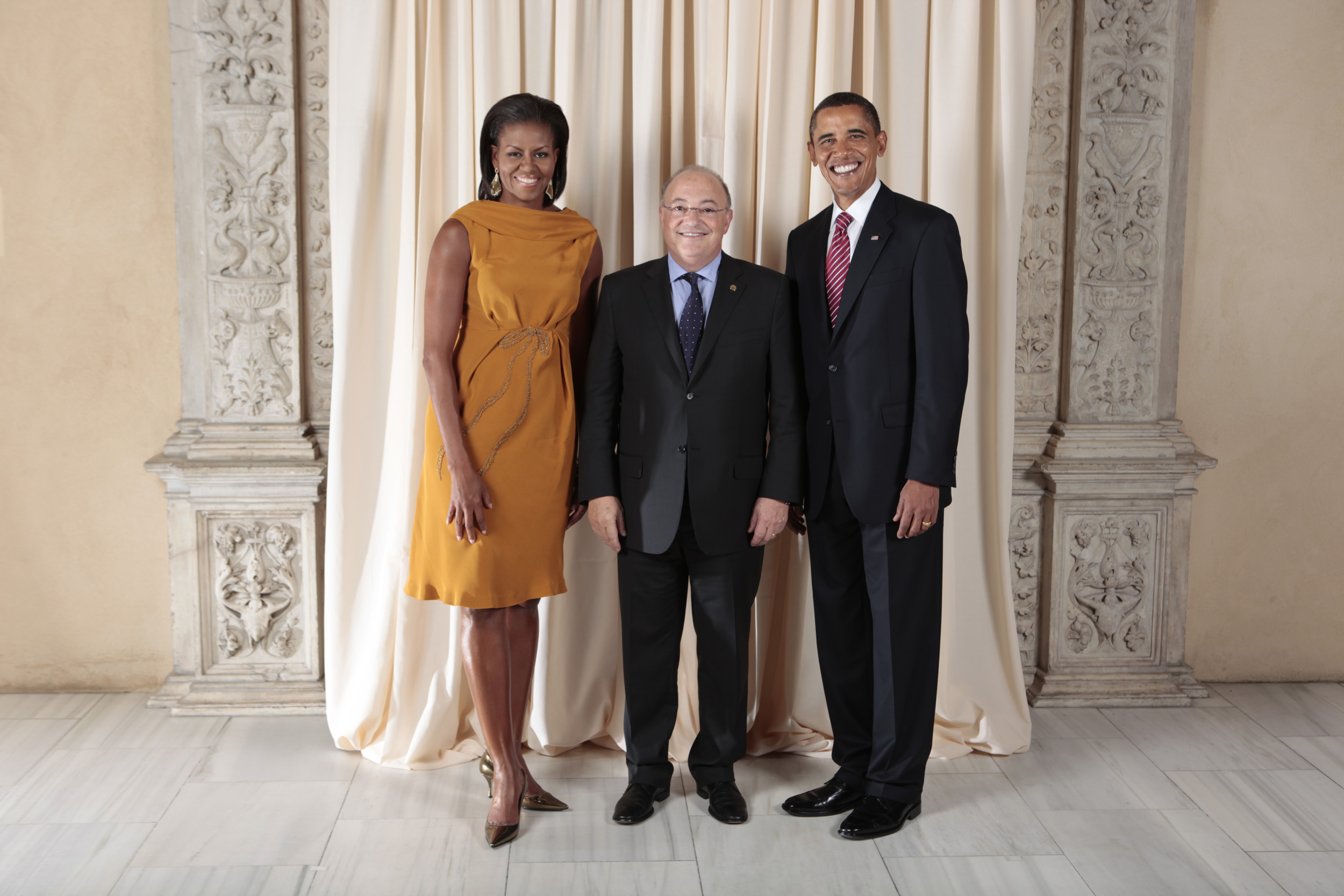
Andorran Minister of External Affairs Xavier Espot Miro with President Barack Obama; 2009.

Andorra and the United States enjoy friendly relations. Diplomatic relations between both nations were established on 21 February 1995 after Andorra adopted a constitution establishing itself as a sovereign parliamentary democracy. Since 2000, Andorra has participated in the U.S. Fulbright Exchange Program and works together with the United States on sharing of confiscated proceeds and instrumentalities of crimes.

There are no significant trade or investments between the two nations. Andorra participates in the American Visa Waiver Program. The United States ambassador to Spain is accredited to Andorra, however, the American consul-general in Barcelona carries out the day-to-day relations with Andorra. Andorra is accredited to the United States from its Permanent Mission to the United Nations based in New York City.

== See also ==
- Foreign relations of Andorra
- Foreign relations of the United States
