= Casa Cristo =

House in Encamp, Andorra

Coordinates: 42.5352°N 1.5824°E

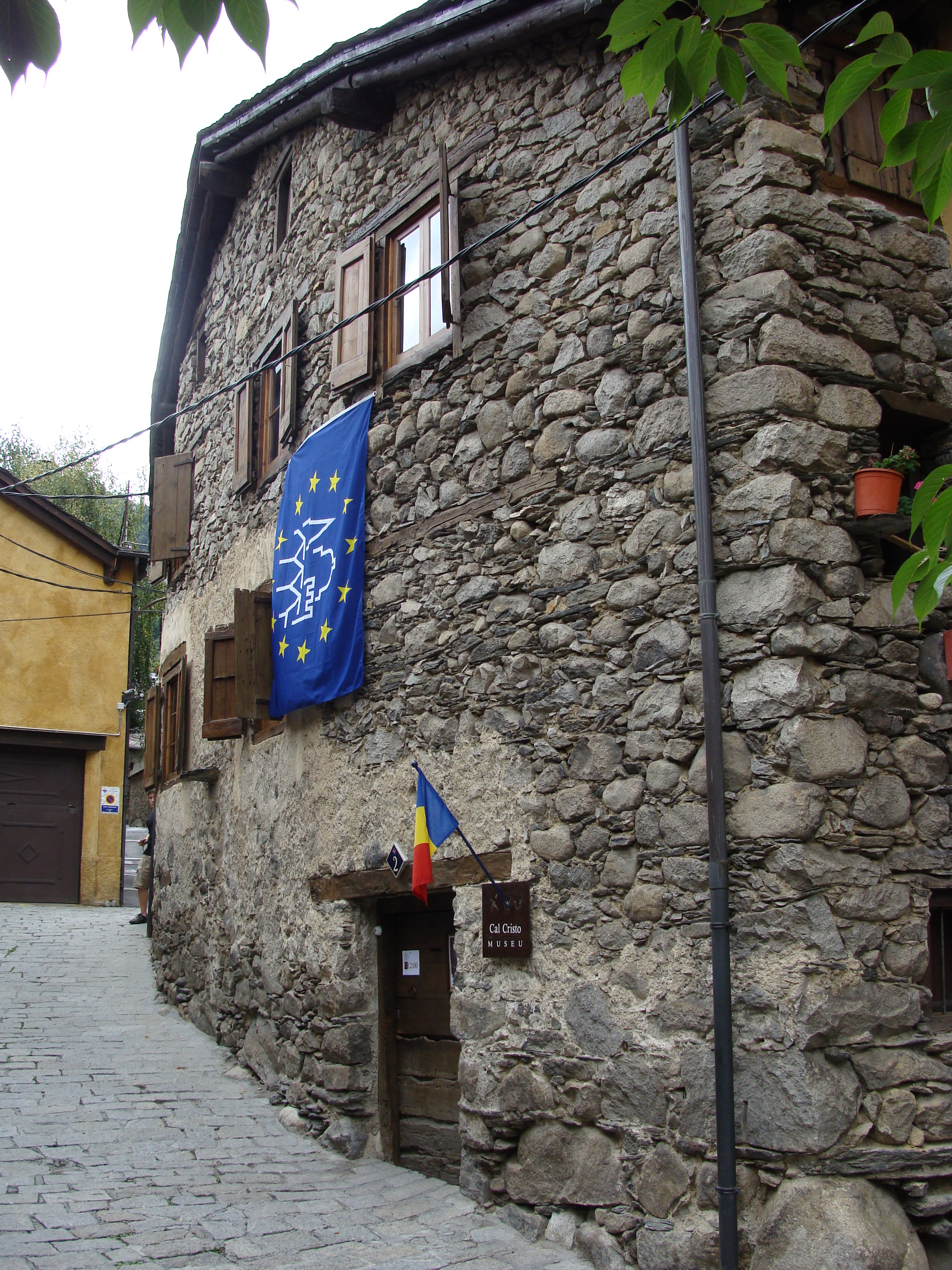
Casa Cristo

Casa Cristo is a house located in Encamp, Andorra. It is a heritage property registered in the Cultural Heritage of Andorra.
