= Postal services in Andorra =

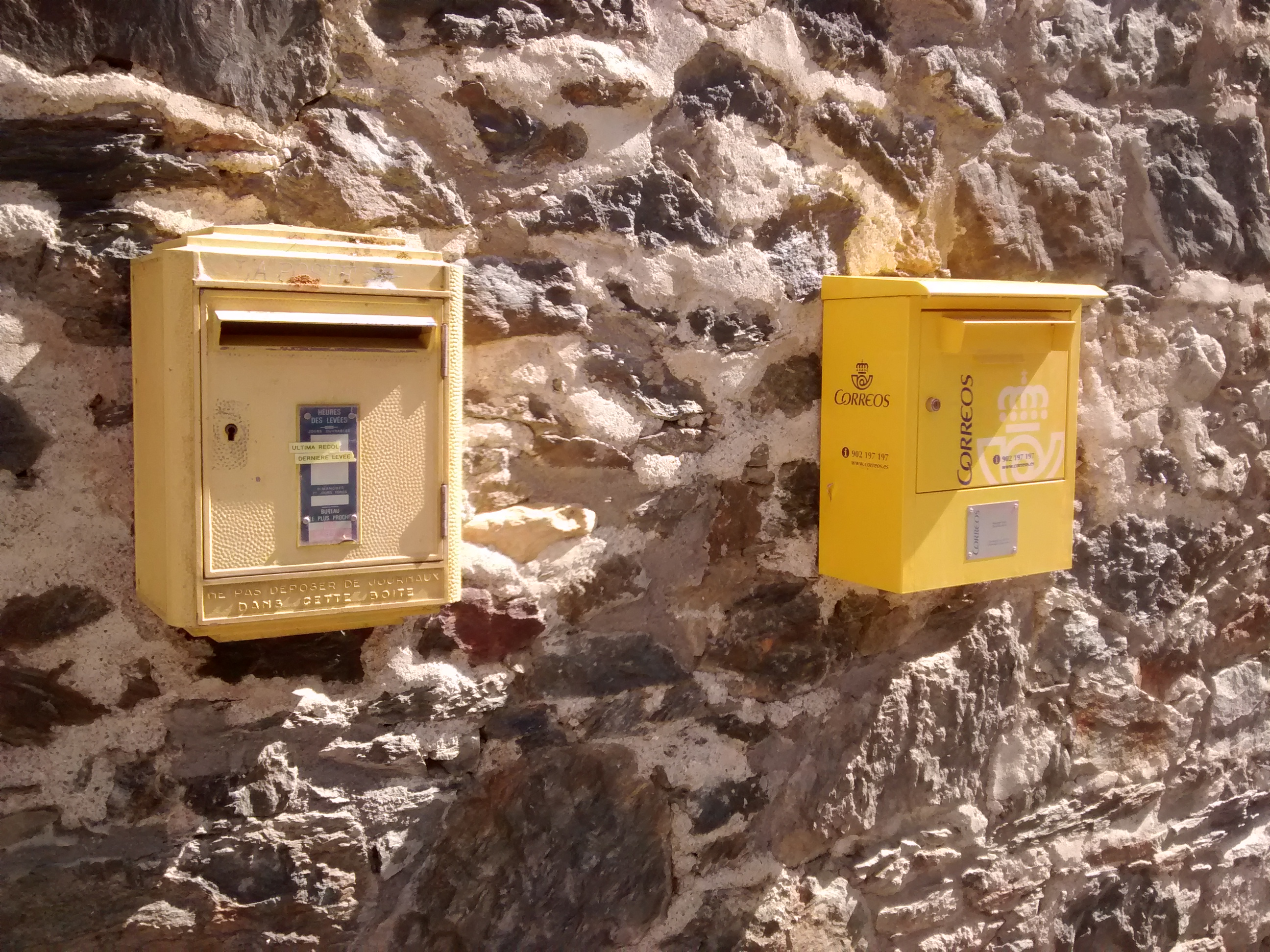
A French post box (left) and a Spanish post box (right) side-by-side in L'Aldosa de la Massana

Postal services in Andorra are unique in that they are not operated by the country itself, but by its two larger neighbouring countries, Spain and France. This is a legacy of the centuries of de facto control exercised by those two countries over Andorra. Correos of Spain and La Poste of France operate side-by-side. However, the postal code system, introduced in July 2004, has a different format from those of either Spain or France, consisting of the letters "AD", followed by three digits.

Both postal administrations issue their own postage stamps for use in Andorra featuring unique designs, as those of Spain and France are not valid. These are used for international correspondence, as postal service within Andorra is free.
