= Superior Court of Justice (Andorra) =

The Superior Court of Justice (Catalan: Tribunal Superior de Justícia) is Andorra's highest court. It exercises original jurisdiction over serious matters in Andorra of which a lower court (or, a magistrate's court) does not have the proper authority to operate and/or act on.
