= Unity and Renewal =

Defunct local political party of Andorra

UiR symbol

Unity and Renewal (Catalan: Unitat i Renovació, UiR) was a local political party in Canillo, Andorra.

== History ==
Although political parties were not legalised until 1993, the party contested the 1992 elections in the Canillo parish, winning three of the four seats.

For the 1997 elections, it was one of several local parties to ally with the Liberal Union to run in parish constituencies. The UiR won two seats as the alliance won a total of 16 of the 28 seats in the General Council, and formed a government under Marc Forné Molné.
