= Official Bulletin of the Principality of Andorra =

Government gazette of Andorra

The Official Bulletin of the Principality of Andorra (BOPA; Catalan: Butlletí Oficial del Principat d'Andorra) is an official publication that by law must include all official documents issued by the government agencies of Andorra (municipalities, legislature, judicial system, etc...). Typical documents include laws, regulations, administrative acts, and any other document that has a legal requirement to be published. The act of being published in the Official Bulletin validates and invests the documents with legal force. It was created on January 30, 1989, and is governed by four articles (A, B, C, D).

== Articles ==
=== Article A ===
The Official Bulletin of the Principality of Andorra will exclusively publish:

1. Directives issued by the co-princes, of the permanent delegates and their personal delegates.
2. Directives issued by the General Council.
3. Directives issued by the government.
4. Directives issued by the municipalities and parishes.
5. Edicts and announcements issued by the courts, by the court of appeals and of legal disputes.
6. Other edicts and official announcements.
7. The announcements and publications of organizations, associations and corporations legally established in Andorra, and the announcements of sales, auctions and job vacancies in the public sector.

Documents will be published in the order specified above.

=== Article B ===
The Official Bulletins of the Principality will normally be published twice a week. In the event of an urgent need, the bulletin will be published more frequently.

=== Article C ===
In addition to the directives listed in numbers 1 to 4 of Article A, the following documents will be published free of charge:

- Official announcements issued by public and quasi-public authorities and organizations, in accordance with the rules of the bulletin.
- Edicts and announcements relating to criminal proceedings, and those originating from other judicial procedures, as long as they are published in the interest of an individual beneficiary of the right to free justice, or on the basis of free judicial assistance.

=== Article D ===
The documents published in the official Bulletin of the Principality of Andorra can be reproduced, totally or in part, in newspapers and other publications, whenever it is appropriate to quote or transcribe them, but they must not be published individually or collectively without the prior written authorization of the entity that issued them.

== Use of BOPA ==
The officially valid version of BOPA was published on paper until 31 December 2014. Since then the official version has been electronic. BOPA is widely used by authorities and the press as a reference. Ministries link their contributions to BOPA on the main pages of their websites. The press regularly references the BOPA in news and comments about laws and directives.

== See also ==
- Portal:Andorra
- Government of Andorra
