= Elections in Andorra =

There are two types of elections in Andorra: parliamentary elections and local elections. The 28 members of the General Council of the Valleys (Consell General de les Valls) are elected in parliamentary elections for a maximum term of four years. In the local elections, the council members of the seven parishes of Andorra are elected for a four-year term.

Elections in Andorra are regulated since the promulgation of the Nova Reforma in 1867.

== Election system ==
The current electoral law was approved in 2014 and replaces the 1993 law. Only people with Andorran nationality and over 18 years old are eligible to vote and to become a candidate.

=== Parliamentary elections ===
All 28 seats of the General Council are elected at the same time. Half of the seats are elected in two-member constituencies based on the seven parishes, with a plurality party block voting method. The remaining 14 are elected in a single nationwide constituency by proportional representation with closed lists. Seats are allocated using the largest remainder method with Hare quota.

Voters have two votes: one for the parish seats, and the other for the PR.

Following the election, the Head of Government (Prime Minister) and the Speaker are elected by the members of the parliament.

=== Local elections ===
The municipal councils (consells comunals), which is the legislature of the parish, must have 10, 12, 14 or 16 seats. The number of seats is determined by the municipal council.

The winning party takes one half of the seats. The other half of the seats are allocated with proportional representation using the largest remainder method, with Hare quota (including the winning party). Lists are closed. With this method, the largest party secures an absolute majority.

Following the election, the cònsol major (mayor) and cònsol menor (deputy mayor) are elected in each parish indirectly by the municipal councillors.

== Latest elections ==
=== Parliamentary elections ===
Party or alliance		PR			Constituency			Total seats	+/–
Party or alliance		Votes	%	Seats	Votes	%	Seats	Total seats	+/–
Government alliance	Democrats for Andorra	6,262	32.66	4	7,835	43.63	10	14	+3
Government alliance	Committed Citizens	6,262	32.66	1	7,835	43.63	1	2	–
Government alliance	Liberals of Andorra	893	4.66	0	7,835	43.63	0	0	–4
Government alliance	Action for Andorra	805	4.20	0	7,835	43.63	1	1	New
Concord		4,109	21.43	3	3,516	19.58	2	5	New
Center-left alliance	Social Democratic Party	4,036	21.05	3	5,238	29.17	0	3	–4
Center-left alliance	Social Democracy and Progress	4,036	21.05	0	5,238	29.17	0	0	–
Andorra Forward		3,067	16.00	3	1,370	7.63	0	3	New
Total		19,172	100.00	14	17,959	100.00	14	28	0
Valid votes		19,172	95.62		17,959	89.60			
Invalid votes		341	1.70		557	2.78			
Blank votes		537	2.68		1,527	7.62			
Total votes		20,050	100.00		20,043	100.00			
Registered voters/turnout		29,958	66.93		29,958	66.90			
Source: Eleccions.ad, Lists

== History and past elections ==
In 1866, a social revolution ended with the promulgation of the New Reform (Nova Reforma) by the Co-princes of Andorra. This decree changed the way the parliament and local councils were elected. Furthermore, a vote per home was granted. The introduced election system was a two-round plurality-at-large voting system. This system remained until the approval of the new Constitution and Electoral Law in 1993.

In 1933, universal male suffrage was introduced. Women's suffrage was introduced in 1970.

From 1867 until 1979, parliamentary and local elections were held every two years, but only one half of the seats were up for election. Since 1981, parliamentary elections are held every four years and all members are up for election simultaneously. Same for local elections since 1983. In 1982, a multi-option referendum was held in order to change the election system. Finally, no option had a majority, and the traditional system remained. An election law was made in 1987, and it included this system.

In 1993, with the adoption of the new Constitution, Andorra ceased to be a feudal country and a new electoral law was made. Parties were also legalised by then. This law combined the proportional and majority systems. The current law is a revision of the 1993 law made in 2014, and the system is the same.

=== Parliamentary elections results 1993–2019 ===
Summary of the nationwide constituency results for the General Council elections, 1993–2019
Election	IDN	AND PD	UL PLA	ND PS	Vd'A	RD APC	DA	SDP	Oth.	Turnout
1993	15.3	26.4	22.0	19.1					17.2	81.0
1997	11.4	27.1	40.5	12.3						81.3
2001		22.7	44.1	28.7						81.6
2005			41.2	38.7	3.5	6.2			11.0	81.4
2009			32.3	45.0	3.2	18.9				75.3
2011			(DA)	34.8	3.3	6.7	55.1			74.1
2015			27.7	23.5	(PS)		37.0	11.7		65.6
2019			12.5	30.6			35.1	5.9	15.9	68.3

Seats won by party at the General Council elections, 1993–2019
Election	IDN	AND PD	UL PLA	ND PS	RD APC	DA	SDP	Local list	Oth.	Total
1993	2	8	5	5				4	4	28
1997	2	6	16	2				2		28
2001		5	15	6				2		28
2005			14	12	(PS)				2	28
2009			11	14	3					28
2011			(DA)	6		20		2		28
2015			8	3		15	2			28
2019			4	7		11			6	28

== See also ==
- Electoral calendar
- Electoral system
