= Bibiana Rossa =

Andorran politician (born 1960)

Bibian Rossa

Minister of Health of Andorra
- In office 8 May 1992 – 22 December 1993
- Prime Minister: Òscar Ribas Reig

Mayor of Canillo
- In office 1995–1999
- In office 2000–2001

Personal details
- Born: 15 January 1960 (age 66) Limoux, France
- Party: Social Democratic Party (PS); Independent
- Education: University of Barcelona

Bibiana Rossa Torres (born 15 January 1960) is an Andorran lawyer and politician, Minister of Health of Andorra between 1992 and 1993 under the government of Prime Minister Òscar Ribas Reig, the first mayor of Canillo between 1995 and 1999, and between 2000 and 2001, and twice member of the General Council.

Alongside Lydia Magallon, Rossa was the first female mayor in Andorra.

== Early life ==
Rossa was born in Limoux, France, on 15 January 1960. Her parents had moved there from Andorra in the 1950s. In June 1953 the family moved to Encamp, Andorra, where her father had gotten a job as a police officer.

Rossa studied at the French School in Encamp, the CEG Ciutat de Valls, the Comte de Foix French High School in Andorra la Vella, and the high school in Prades, Pyrénées-Orientales, France. Rossa began working in France as a court clerk at the age of 16 and became a court clerk in 1978. She later obtained a certificate of aptitude in law from the University of Perpignan.

== Career ==
In 1989, she left the profession, and in 1992 she was elected in that year's parliamentary constituent elections. The newly re-elected Prime Minister Òscar Ribas Reig appointed her Minister of Health, and she was sworn in on 8 May 1992, being the only female minister in the constituent government and the second in the country's history. As minister, Rossa celebrated World AIDS Day for the first time on 1 December 1993. She also promoted the celebration of International Women's Day. She was dismissed on 22 December 1993.

Rossa was elected as the first mayor of Canillo in the 1995 local elections. She was sworn in on 1 January 1996. Alongside Lydia Magallon, Rossa was the first female mayor of Andorra. She was unable to complete her term as mayor because in 1999, due to tensions within her government team, she faced a vote of no confidence which she lost, although she remained leader of the opposition.

She ran again as a candidate in the 1999 local elections, which she won by a large majority. Just over a year after taking office, in November 2001, Rossa resigned after failing to obtain sufficient support and resources to launch major projects.

After retiring from politics, she opened a hotel, finished her law career and practised as a lawyer. She was a candidate for the Social Democratic Party in the 2009 parliamentary election, and won a seat. She was not re-elected in the 2011 snap election.
