= List of political parties in Andorra =

Andorra has a multi-party system. The party system in Andorra has changed dramatically since the adoption of the new Constitution in 1993. Prior to that, there was no national circumscription in the elections and political parties were essentially limited to parochial outfits.

== Current parties ==
Name	Abbr.	Leader	Ideology	General Council	Political position	European
Democrats for Andorra; Demòcrates per Andorra	DA	Xavier Espot Zamora	Liberal conservatism	16 / 28	Centre-right	ALDE (PACE)
Committed Citizens; Ciutadans Compromesos	CC	David Baró Riba	Social liberalism; Environmentalism; Localism	16 / 28	Centre	ALDE (PACE)
Concord; Concòrdia		Cerni Escalé Cabré	Progressivism; Environmentalism	5 / 28	Left-wing	SOC (PACE)
Social Democratic Party; Partit Socialdemòcrata	PS	Pere López Agràs	Social democracy	3 / 28	Centre-left	PES (observer)
Social Democracy and Progress; Socialdemocràcia i Progrés	SDP	Víctor Naudi	Social democracy	3 / 28	Centre-left	—N/a
Andorra Forward; Andorra Endavant	AE	Carine Montaner	Souverainism; Euroscepticism	3 / 28	Right-wing	—N/a
Action for Andorra; Acció per Andorra	Acció	Judith Pallarés	Social liberalism; Progressivism; Pro-Europeanism	1 / 28	Centre	ALDE

=== Extra-parliamentary parties ===
Party	Catalan name	Ideology
Lauredian Union	Unió Laurediana	Localism; Conservatism
Liberals of Andorra	Liberals d'Andorra	Conservative liberalism; Pro-Europeanism
National Union of Progress	Unió Nacional de Progrés	
Third Way	Tercera Via	Conservatism; Souverainism

== Defunct parties ==
Party family tree
- ND	AND	IDN	UL
  PS	PD
  PLA
  VA	RD	CDA+S21
  NC
  APC	RC
  DA
  SDP	L'A
  AS	TV
  Concòrdia	ACC!Ó	AE

Excluding regional parties

- Andorra for Change (Andorra pel Canvi)
- Andorran Democratic Centre (Centre Demòcrata Andorrà)
- Century 21 (Segle 21)
- Citizens' Initiative (Iniciativa Ciutadana)
- Democratic Party (Partit Demòcrata)
- Democratic Renewal (Renovació Democràtica)
- Greens of Andorra (Els Verds d'Andorra)
- National Democratic Group (Agrupament Nacional Democràtic)
- New Centre (Nou Centre)
- Parochial Union of Independents Group (Grup d'Unió Parroquial Independents)
- Parochial Union of Ordino (Unió Parroquial d'Ordino)
- Reformist Coalition (Coalició Reformista)
- Renewal Party of Ordino (Partit Renovador d'Ordino)
- Union, Common Sense and Progress (Unió, Seny i Progrés)
- Unity and Renewal (Unitat i Renovació)

== See also ==
- Politics of Andorra
- List of political parties by country
