= Permanent Representative of Andorra to the United Nations Office at Geneva =

Coordinates: 46.207923°N 6.145461°E

The Andorran Permanent Representative to the United Nations Office at Geneva has his residence in Andorra La Vella and is also accredited as Observer to the World Trade Organization.

== List of heads of mission ==
designated/accredited	ambassador	Observation	List of heads of government of Andorra	Term end
1971	Enrique Valeri	first secretary in the Spanish mission at Geneva	Joan Martí i Alanis	
March 24, 2010	Lluís Viu Torres	(* March 27, 1943): From 1992 to 1999 he was mayor of Andorra la Vella	Jaume Bartumeu	July 6, 2011
October 21, 2011	Enric Tarrado Vives	(* August 5, 1962 ): From April 25, 2005 to March 2, 2009 he was Member of the General Council (Andorra), chairman of the fraction of the Andorran Democratic Centre + Segle XXI Vicepresident de la Comissió Legislativa de Finances i Pressupost Membre de la Comissió Legislativa de Política Territorial i Urbanisme Membre del Comitè executiu del grup nacional andorrà de la Unió Interparlamentària. 21 October 2011: The new Permanent Representative of Andorra, Mr. Enric Tarrado Vives, presented his credentials to the Director-General, who welcomed him as his country’s new representative to the United Nations in Geneva.	Antoni Martí	
