= 2005 electoral calendar =

National and federal elections held in 2005

This electoral calendar 2005 lists the national/federal direct elections held in 2005 in the de jure and de facto sovereign states and their dependent territories. Referendums are included, although they are not elections. By-elections are not included.

== January ==
- 2 January: Croatia, President (1st round)
- 9 January: Palestine, National Authority, President
- 12 January: Abkhazia, Rerun of the presidential election
- 16 January: Croatia, President (2nd round)
- 22 January: Maldives, Parliament
- 25 January: Tokelau, Island council
- 30 January: Iraq, Parliament

== February ==
- 6 February: Thailand, Parliament
- 8 February: Denmark, Parliament
- 20 February: Portugal, Parliament
- 20 February: Northern Cyprus, Parliament
- 20 February: Spain, referendum on the European Constitution
- 21 February: Anguilla, Parliament
- 27 February: Tajikistan, Parliament (1st round)
- 27 February: Kyrgyzstan, Parliament (1st round)
- 28 February: Burundi, referendum on the new constitution

== March ==
- 6 March: Moldova, Parliament
- 8 March: Micronesia, Parliament
- 11 and 13 March: Liechtenstein, Parliament
- 13 March: Central African Republic, President (1st round)
- 13 March: Kyrgyzstan, Parliament (2nd round)
- 17 March: Tonga, Parliament
- 24 March: Tajikistan, Parliament (2nd round)
- 31 March: Zimbabwe, Parliament

== April ==
- 8 April: Djibouti, President
- 17 April: Northern Cyprus, President
- 24 April: Andorra, Parliament
- 24 April: Togo, President
- 30 April: Niue, Parliament

== May ==
- 5 May–23 June: United Kingdom, Parliament
- 5 May: Dominica, Parliament
- 8 May: Central African Republic, President (2nd round)
- 11 May: Cayman Islands, Parliament
- 14 May: Republic of China, National Assembly
- 15 May: Ethiopia, Parliament
- 22 May: Mongolia, President
- 25 May: Egypt, Constitutional referendum
- 25 May: Suriname, Parliament
- 29 May: France, referendum on the European Constitution
- 29 May: Lebanon, Parliament

== June ==
- 1 June: Netherlands, referendum on the European Constitution
- 5 June: Switzerland, referendum on Schengen and Dublin treaties, as well as on civil unions for homosexuals
- 6 June: Chad, referendum on presidential terms
- 17 June: Iran, President
- 19 June: Guinea-Bissau, President
- 5/12/19 June: Lebanon, Parliament
- 19 June: Nagorno-Karabakh Republic, Parliament
- 24 June: Iran, President (2nd round)
- 25 June: Bulgaria, Parliament

== July ==
- 3 July: Albania, Parliament
- 3 July: Mauritius, Parliament
- 4 July: Burundi, Parliament
- 10 July: Kyrgyzstan, President
- 10 July: Luxembourg, referendum on the European Constitution

== August ==
- 19 August: Burundi, President
- 27 August: Singapore, President
- 30 August: Saint Helena, Parliament

== September ==
- 7 September: Egypt, President
- 11 September: Japan, House of Representatives
- 12 September: Norway, Parliament
- 17 September: New Zealand, Parliament
- 18 September: Afghanistan, Parliament
- 18 September: Germany, Federal Parliament
- 23 September: Aruba, Parliament
- 25 September: Poland, Sejm and Senate
- 25 September: Macau, Parliament
- 29 September: Somaliland, Parliament

== October ==
- 9 October: Poland, President (1st round)
- 11 October: Liberia, President, Senate, and House of Representatives
- 15 October: Iraq, constitutional referendum
- 19 October: Jersey, Senators
- 23 October: Argentina, Congress and senate
- 23 October: Poland, President (2nd round)
- 23 October: Brazil, referendum on the prohibition of personal firearms

== November ==
- 6 November: Azerbaijan, Parliament
- 8 November: Northern Mariana Islands, Governor, House and Senate
- 13 November: Burkina Faso, President
- 15 November: Greenland, Parliament
- 17 November: Falkland Islands, Legislative Council
- 17 November: Sri Lanka, President
- 19/20 November: Egypt, Parliament
- 1 December: Egypt, Parliament
- 21 November: Kenya, Referendum on the new Constitution
- 23 November: Jersey, Deputies
- 26 November: Zimbabwe, Senate
- 27 November: Armenia, Referendum on Constitution
- 27 November: Honduras, President and Congress
- 27 November: Gabon, President

== December ==
- 4 December: Venezuela, Parliament
- 4 December: Kazakhstan, President
- 7 December: St. Vincent and the Grenadines, Parliament
- 11 December: Chile, President (1st Round), Parliament
- 11 December: Transnistria, Parliament
- 14 December: Tanzania, President and Parliament
- 15 December: Iraq, Parliament
- 18 December: Bolivia, President, Parliament
- 18 December: Democratic Republic of Congo, Referendum on the new Constitution
- 24 December: Pitcairn, Island council and island magistrate

== See also ==
- Elections in 2005
