= 2005 Andorran parliamentary election =

- 24 April 2005
- All 28 seats in the General Council
Party	Leader	Vote %	Seats	+/–
PLA	Marc Forné Molné	41.21	14	−1
PS+RD+GUPI	Jaume Bartumeu	44.31	12	+6
CDA+S21	Enric Tarrado Vives	10.99	2	New
This lists parties that won seats. See the complete results below.
Results by parish
Prime Minister before	Prime Minister after
Marc Forné Molné; PLA	Albert Pintat; PLA

Parliamentary elections were held in Andorra on 24 April 2005. The result was a victory for the Liberal Party of Andorra, which won 14 of the 28 seats. Its leader, Marc Forné Molné, remained Prime Minister. Voter turnout was 80.4%.

== Results ==
Party or alliance		PR			Constituency			Total seats	+/–
Party or alliance		Votes	%	Seats	Votes	%	Seats	Total seats	+/–
Liberal Party of Andorra		5,100	41.21	6	5,473	46.24	8	14	–1
L'Alternativa	Social Democratic Party	4,711	38.07	6	5,235	44.23	5	11	+5
L'Alternativa	Democratic Renewal	772	6.24	0	5,235	44.23	1	1	New
Andorran Democratic Centre+Century 21		1,360	10.99	2	1,127	9.52	0	2	New
Greens of Andorra		433	3.50	0	0	New			
Total		12,376	100.00	14	11,835	100.00	14	28	0
Valid votes		12,376	96.09		11,835	91.89			
Invalid/blank votes		503	3.91		1,045	8.11			
Total votes		12,879	100.00		12,880	100.00			
Registered voters/turnout		16,022	80.38		16,022	80.39			
Source: Nohlen & Stöver, IPU
