= Coalition for Progress (Andorra) =

Defunct Andorran electoral alliance

Coalition for Progress (Catalan: Coalició pel Progrés) was a progressive electoral alliance formed in Andorra. The alliance was a merger of the Democratic National Initiative, National Democratic Group and New Democracy (Andorra).

== History ==
In 1999, three progressive parties from the opposition formed an electoral alliance for the 1999 local elections. This coalition presented lists in Andorra la Vella and Escaldes-Engordany. In the elections, it obtained 2,416 votes and 13 councillors, and won in Andorra la Vella.

The media consider their successor to be the Social Democratic Party.
