= Lydia Magallon =

Andorran politician (born 1960)

Mayor of Escaldes-Engordany
- In office 1995–2003
- Succeeded by: Antoni Martí

Personal details
- Born: October 10, 1960 (age 65) Escales-Engordany, Andorra
- Party: Liberals of Andorra
- Occupation: Politician; Teacher

Lydia Magallon Font (born 10 October 1960) is an Andorran teacher and politician, mayor of Escaldes-Engordany between 1995 and 2003.

Alongside Bibiana Rossa, Magallon was the first female mayor in Andorra. She is also an environmental activist.

== Early life and education ==
Magallon was born on 10 October 1960 in Escaldes-Engordany, Andorra in a family with strong ties to the municipality. Her grandmother took in refugees from the Spanish Civil War. After finishing secondary school, Magallon moved to Barcelona to study teaching and also studied Catalan philology. She has a younger brother, also a local politician, and sister.

== Career ==
After completing her studies in the 1980s, Magallon returned to Andorra, where she was invited to join the educational team of what was then the Department of Education, an institution that predated the Constitution that established the ministries. The aim of this team was to promote the Escola Andorrana, a project that created a wholly Andorran education system in Catalan language.

Her political career began in the 1990s, when Magallon was appointed Secretary of State for the Environment. In that position, which she held for just over a year, she signed the first agreement with Spain for the export of waste and promoted recycling.

For the 1995 local election, Magallon was called by the Liberals of Andorra as leader of party's candidacy in Escaldes-Engordany. She won the election and alongside Bibiana Rossa, Magallon was the first female mayor in Andorra. She was re-elected in the 1999 local election. As mayor, Magallon promoted important projects, such as the consolidation of spa resort Caldea and secured UNESCO World Heritage status for Madriu-Perafita-Claror Valley in 2004. She was succeeded by Antoni Martí.

After her political career, Magallon has devoted herself to the family business of organic products. She has also been involved in environmental activism and has been highly critical of urban planning policies that have meant that Andorra "no longer belongs to the people".
