= 1995 Andorran local elections =

The 1995 Andorran local elections were held on 3 December. Voters elected the council members of the seven parishes.

They were the first local elections after the legalisation of political parties in 1993.

== Electoral system ==
The electoral law was changed together with the approval of the new Constitution and the legalisation of political parties. Voters elect the members of the municipal councils (consells de comú in Catalan). The electoral law allows the municipal councils to choose their numbers of seats, which must be an even number between 10 and 16.

All city council members are elected in single multi-member districts, consisting of the whole parish, using closed lists. Half of the seats are allocated to the party with the most votes. The other half of the seats are allocated using the Hare quota (including the winning party). With this system the winning party obtains an absolute majority.

The cònsol major (mayor) and the cònsol menor (deputy mayor) are elected indirectly by the municipal councillors.

== Results ==
=== Overall ===
Following the elections, two women were elected cònsols majors (mayors) for first time in Andorra.

Party	Votes	%	Seats
New Democracy	2,077	29.6	14
Liberal Party	1,531	21.8	10
National Democratic Group	1,124	16.0	20
Union and Progress	496	7.1	2
Liberal Opinion Group	403	5.7	8
Parochial Forum	154	2.2	3
Independents	1,240	17.7	23
Blank votes	1,030	–	–
Invalid votes	39	–	–
Total	8,094	100	80
Registered voters/turnout	10,411	77.7	–

=== Canillo ===
Party	Votes	%	Seats
Bibiana Rossa (IND)	223	59.2	11
Parochial Forum	154	40.8	3
Blank votes	17	–	–
Invalid votes	4	–	–
Total	398	100	14
Registered voters/turnout	476	83.6	–

=== Encamp ===
Party	Votes	%	Seats
National Democratic Group	555	52.8	8
Union and Progress	496	47.2	2
Blank votes	80	–	–
Invalid votes	4	–	–
Total	1,135	100	10
Registered voters/turnout	1,373	82.7	–

=== Ordino ===
Party	Votes	%	Seats
Josep Duró (IND)	163	42.8	7
Bonaventura Espot (IND)	113	29.7	2
Pere Babi (IND)	105	27.6	1
Blank votes	15	–	–
Invalid votes	0	–	–
Total	396	100	10
Registered voters/turnout	497	79.7	–

=== La Massana ===
Party	Votes	%	Seats
Liberal Opinion Group	403	64.0	8
New Democracy	227	36.0	2
Blank votes	55	–	–
Invalid votes	1	–	–
Total	686	100	10
Registered voters/turnout	814	84.3	–

=== Andorra la Vella ===
Party	Votes	%	Seats
New Democracy	1,354	61.9	10
Liberal Party	835	38.1	2
Blank votes	273	–	–
Invalid votes	4	–	–
Total	2,466	100	12
Registered voters/turnout	3,227	76.4	–

=== Sant Julià de Lòria ===
Party	Votes	%	Seats
National Democratic Group	569	100	12
Blank votes	479	–	–
Invalid votes	20	–	–
Total	1,068	100	12
Registered voters/turnout	1,609	66.4	–

=== Escaldes-Engordany ===
Party	Votes	%	Seats
Liberal Party	696	38.1	8
Jacint Casal (IND)	636	34.8	2
Democratic National Initiative–New Democracy	496	27.1	2
Blank votes	111	–	–
Invalid votes	6	–	–
Total	1,945	100	12
Registered voters/turnout	2,415	80.5	–
