= 1979 Andorran parliamentary election =

- 13 December 1979 (first round); 20 December 1979 (second round)
- 14 of the 28 seats in the General Council
Party	Vote %	Seats	+/–
Independents	100	14	0
This lists parties that won seats. See the complete results below.

Parliamentary elections were held in Andorra on 13 December 1979 to elect half of the members of the General Council. In constituencies where no candidate received a majority of the vote, a second round of voting on 20 December.

The elections were held alongside local elections, the last time the two elections were held on the same day.

== Background ==
In 1978 the number of parishes was increased from six to seven with the creation of Escaldes–Engordany by splitting Andorra la Vella. As the General Council had four members for each parish, it was increased in size from 24 to 28 seats. Supplementary elections were held in Andorra la Vella and Escaldes–Engordany in July 1978 to elect four additional members, who would serve until the regularly scheduled 1981 elections.

== Electoral system ==
All candidates had to run on lists of four candidates; although each constituency had two seats, voters had to vote for four candidates, which they could split between candidates on different lists. Any candidate receiving a majority of the vote was elected in the first round. If there were remaining seats to fill, a second round was held, in which candidates had to receive a majority of the vote to be elected. If there were still remaining seats to fill, a third round would be held in which the candidate(s) with the most votes would be elected.

== Results ==
No candidates were nominated in Sant Julià de Lòria. As a result, the municipal councillors of the parish elected two of their own members to the General Council.

A second round was only required in Canillo.

Party	First round			Second round			Total seats
Party	Votes	%	Seats	Votes	%	Seats	Total seats
Independents	1,816	100.00	12			2	14
Total	1,816	100.00	12			2	14
Valid votes	1,816	83.07					
Invalid votes	81	3.71					
Blank votes	289	13.22					
Total votes	2,186	100.00					
Registered voters/turnout	2,950	74.10		283	–		
Source: La Vanguardia

=== Elected members ===
Constituency	Elected members
Andorra la Vella	Jaume Bartomeu Canturri
Andorra la Vella	Eduard Rosell Pujal
Canillo	
Encamp	Pere Marsenyach
Encamp	Josep Maria Mas
Escaldes–Engordany	Marcel Besolí
Escaldes–Engordany	Dot Martí
La Massana	Albert Gelabert
La Massana	Josep Montané
Ordino	Guillem Adelach
Ordino	Miquel Pujal
Sant Julià de Lòria	Marc Codina Travesset
Sant Julià de Lòria	Emili Grau Tor
Source: Avui

== Aftermath ==
The elections were the last partial renewal of the General Council, with future elections being for a full renewal of the parliament, starting with the 1981 elections.
