= 1993 Andorran parliamentary election =

- 12 December 1993
- All 28 seats in the General Council; 15 seats needed for a majority
- Turnout: 80.92% (▼1.36pp)
Party	Leader	Vote %	Seats
AND	Òscar Ribas Reig	26.36	8
UL	Marc Forné Molné	22.01	5
ND	Jaume Bartumeu	19.13	5
CNA	Antoni Cerqueda Gispert	17.16	4
IDN	Vicenç Mateu Zamora	15.34	2
Independents	–	–	4
This lists parties that won seats. See the complete results below.
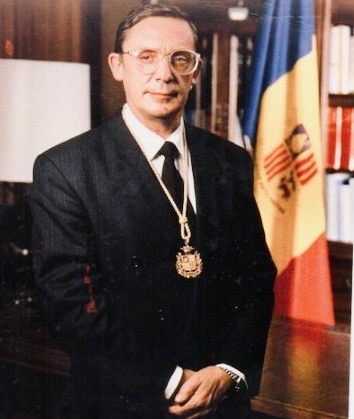

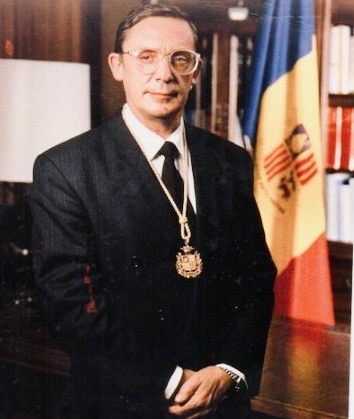
Prime Minister before	Prime Minister after
Òscar Ribas Reig; AND	Òscar Ribas Reig; AND

Parliamentary elections were held in Andorra on 12 December 1993. Following the adoption of a new constitution by a referendum earlier in the year, they were the first elections in which political parties were allowed to run. The result was a victory for the National Democratic Group, which won eight seats, and its leader Òscar Ribas Reig remained Prime Minister. Voter turnout was 81%.

== Results ==
Party	PR			Constituency			Total seats
Party	Votes	%	Seats	Votes	%	Seats	Total seats
National Democratic Group	1,906	26.36	4	1,254	27.37	4	8
Liberal Union	1,591	22.01	3	1,103	24.08	2	5
New Democracy	1,383	19.13	3	406	8.86	2	5
National Andorran Coalition	1,241	17.16	2	1,280	27.94	2	4
Democratic National Initiative	1,109	15.34	2				2
Independents				538	11.74	4	4
Total	7,230	100.00	14	4,581	100.00	14	28
Total votes	7,829	–					
Registered voters/turnout	9,675	80.92					
Source: IPU, La Vanguardia, Avui
