= 1985 Andorran parliamentary election =

- 12 December 1985 19 December 1985

All 28 seats in the General Council 15 seats needed for a majority

Parliamentary elections were held in Andorra on 12 and 19 December 1985. As political parties were not legalised until 1993, all candidates ran as independents. Following the election, Josep Pintat-Solans remained Prime Minister.

== Electoral system ==
All 28 seats of the General Council were up for election. Each parish formed a constituency, electing four members each. Members of the Parliament were elected using a two-round plurality voting system. The voting age was lowered from 21 to 18 years old prior to the elections.

As political parties were not legalised until 1993, all candidates ran as independents, although press and newspapers considered some candidates to be government endorsed (supporting Pintat government) or opponents.

Following the election, the General Council elected the Prime Minister of Andorra and the General Syndic (speaker).

== Results ==
Voter turnout was 80.1%. A second round was held in Sant Julià de Lòria, where one seat remained unfilled as the fourth-place candidate failed to obtain an absolute majority in the first round. For the first time, a woman was elected as a member of the General Council.

Party	First round			Second round			Total seats
Party	Votes	%	Seats	Votes	%	Seats	Total seats
Independents	4,017	100.00	27			1	28
Total	4,017	100.00	27			1	28
Valid votes	4,017	95.05					
Invalid/blank votes	209	4.95					
Total votes	4,226	100.00					
Registered voters/turnout	5,273	80.14					
Source: Nohlen & Stöver, La Vanguardia

=== By affiliation ===
Parish	Government endorsed	Opposition
Canillo	4	0
Encamp	4	0
Ordino	4	0
La Massana	4	0
Andorra la Vella	3	1
Sant Julià de Lòria	4	0
Escaldes-Engordany	0	4
Total	23	5
Source: La Vanguardia
