= Conxita Mora Jordana =

Andorran politician

Conxita Mora

Cònsol Major of Andorra la Vella
- In office 1999–2003

General Councilor
- In office 2009–2011

Personal details
- Born: 15 April 1955 Andorra la Vella, Andorra
- Died: 5 October 2016 (aged 61)
- Party: Coalition for Progress
- Occupation: Politician and businesswoman

Conxita Mora Jordana (15 April 1955 – 5 October 2016), was an Andorran politician, first female Mayor of Andorra la Vella between 1999 and 2003. In 2007, she was the director of the Andorran business federation.

Between 2009 and 2011, she was a member of the General Council of Andorra with the Reformist Coalition.
