= 1989 Andorran parliamentary election =

- 10 December 1989 17 December 1989

All 28 seats in the General Council 15 seats needed for a majority

Parliamentary elections were held in Andorra on 10 December 1989, with a second round of voting on 17 December. Following the elections, Òscar Ribas Reig became Prime Minister, elected on 12 January 1990 by a vote of 23−5.

== Electoral system ==
All 28 seats of the General Council were up for election. Each parish formed a constituency, electing four members each. Members of the Parliament were elected using a two-round plurality voting system. The voting age was 18 years old.

As political parties were not legalised until 1993, all candidates ran as independents, although press and newspapers considered some candidates to be government endorsed (supporting Pintat government) or opponents.

Following the elections, the General Council elected the Prime Minister of Andorra and the General Syndic (speaker).

== Results ==
Voter turnout was 82.3%. A second round of voting was held in Andorra la Vella, Canillo and Ordino.

Party	First round			Second round			Total seats
Party	Votes	%	Seats	Votes	%	Seats	Total seats
Independents	5,778	100.00	25			3	28
Total	5,778	100.00	25			3	28
Valid votes	5,778	97.90					
Invalid/blank votes	124	2.10					
Total votes	5,902	100.00					
Registered voters/turnout	7,173	82.28					
Source: Nohlen & Stöver, La Vanguardia, La Vanguardia

=== By affiliation ===
Although government endorsed candidates won the elections in terms of seats, in the most populated parishes (Andorra la Vella and Escaldes-Engordany), the opposition candidates received more votes. This was seen as a decrease of support of Josep Pintat-Solans's policies, and Òscar Ribas Reig was elected Prime Minister of Andorra.

Parish	Government-endorsed	Opposition
Canillo	4	0
Encamp	4	0
Ordino	0	4
La Massana	4	0
Andorra la Vella	0	4
Sant Julià de Lòria	4	0
Escaldes-Engordany	0	4
Total	16	12
Source: La Vanguardia, La Vanguardia
