= Òscar Ribas Reig =

Andorran politician (1936–2020)

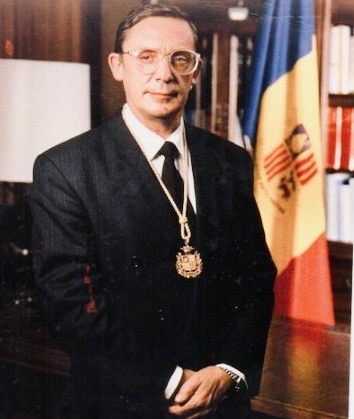
- Official portrait

Prime Minister of Andorra
- In office 12 January 1990 – 7 December 1994
- Monarchs: Episcopal Co-prince: Joan Martí i Alanis; French Co-prince: François Mitterrand
- Preceded by: Josep Pintat-Solans
- Succeeded by: Marc Forné Molné
- In office 8 January 1982 – 21 May 1984
- Monarchs: Episcopal Co-prince: Joan Martí i Alanis; French Co-prince: François Mitterrand
- Preceded by: Position established
- Succeeded by: Josep Pintat-Solans

General Councillor
- In office 1972–1979

Personal details
- Born: 26 October 1936 Sant Julià de Lòria, Andorra
- Died: 18 December 2020 (aged 84) Sant Julià de Lòria, Andorra
- Party: National Democratic Group
- Spouse: Roser Duró Ribó
- Children: 5
- Education: University of Barcelona; University of Fribourg
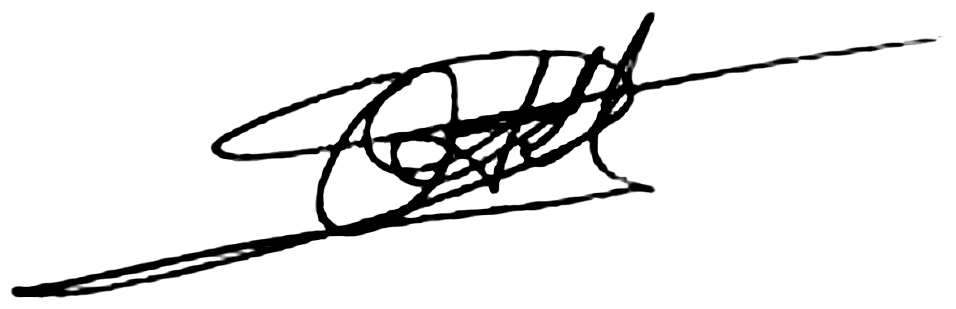
- Signature

Òscar Ribas Reig (Catalan: [ˈɔskəɾ ˈriβəz ˈret͡ʃ]; 26 October 1936 – 18 December 2020) was an Andorran politician, lawyer, and businessman who became the first prime minister of Andorra in 1982. He twice served as head of government, first from 8 January 1982 to 21 May 1984 and again from 12 January 1990 to 7 December 1994.

During his term, the first Constitution was adopted, Andorra became member of the United Nations and the country developed its institutions and foreign relations.

== Early life and education ==
Òscar Ribas Reig was born in Sant Julià de Lòria, Andorra, on 26 October 1936 to an Andorran father and a Catalan mother. He moved to Spain as a child, living in Barcelona where he attended La Salle Bonanova School and then graduated in law from the University of Barcelona in 1959. In 1961, he completed a master's degree in political philosophy from the University of Fribourg in Switzerland. He was married to Roser Duró Ribó and had five children.

== Political career ==
=== Early political years ===
Ribas Reig's earliest political service was as Secretary to the City Council of his native Sant Julià de Lòria between 1963 and 1965. Following the 1971 parliamentary elections, he was elected a member of the General Council (then named the "General Council of the Valleys") as an independent, because it was not until 1993 that political parties were legalized and political parliamentary groups were formed in Andorra. He remained a member until 1979, when he declined to compete in that year's parliamentary elections. During that period, he held the Finance portfolio which, as there was then no institutionalized separation of powers, was a position comparable to that of Minister of Finance.

In 1973, alongside lawmaker Jaume Bartumeu Canturri, Ribas Reig presented a motion to the Consell General to grant the right to Andorran women to get elected, which was approved four months later.

=== First term as prime minister: 1982–1984 ===
During Andorra's institutional reform process, Ribas Reig was considered to be a possible new head of government, especially after the 1981 parliamentary election in which he was re-elected for the Sant Julià de Lòria parish. When the position of prime minister was created, he was the first to be elected to the office by the General Council on 8 January 1982, while he was in Latin America. On 14 January, he presented to the General Council the first Executive Cabinet and the government program.

On 1 May 1984, he resigned due to lack of parliamentary support and the difficulties of trying to implement a new tax law. He was succeeded by Josep Pintat-Solans on 25 May.

=== Later terms as prime minister: 1990–1994 ===
Ribas Reig was again elected head of government after the 1989 parliamentary election on 12 January 1990. In 1990, he signed a Customs Agreement with the European Economic Community. In 1992, Ribas Reig resigned after his efforts to introduce a new constitution securing civil human rights were blocked by conservatives.

After the 1992 parliamentary election, on 5 May he was invested for a third time. His third term was highlighted by the ratification of the first Andorran Constitution by referendum on 14 March 1993, under which the principality formally abandoned the previous feudal system.

Ribas Reig founded the center-right political coalition National Democratic Group (Agrupament Democràtic Nacional), with which he ran for the 1993 parliamentary election, the first after the legalization of political parties. His candidacy won but failed to achieve an absolute majority. He was re-inaugurated on 19 January 1994, after reaching an agreement with the New Democracy and Democratic National Initiative parties. In 1994, Andorra became a member of the United Nations, and Ribas Reig gave the admission speech at the United Nations General Assembly on 28 July 1993, which was the first delivered before the international parliamentary body in Catalan.

On 25 November 1994, after losing the vote of confidence which he presented due to the crisis in the government coalition, Ribas Reig submitted his resignation from the position as head of government taking effect on 8 December 1994; the liberal opposition leader Marc Forné was named to succeed him.

== Later life ==
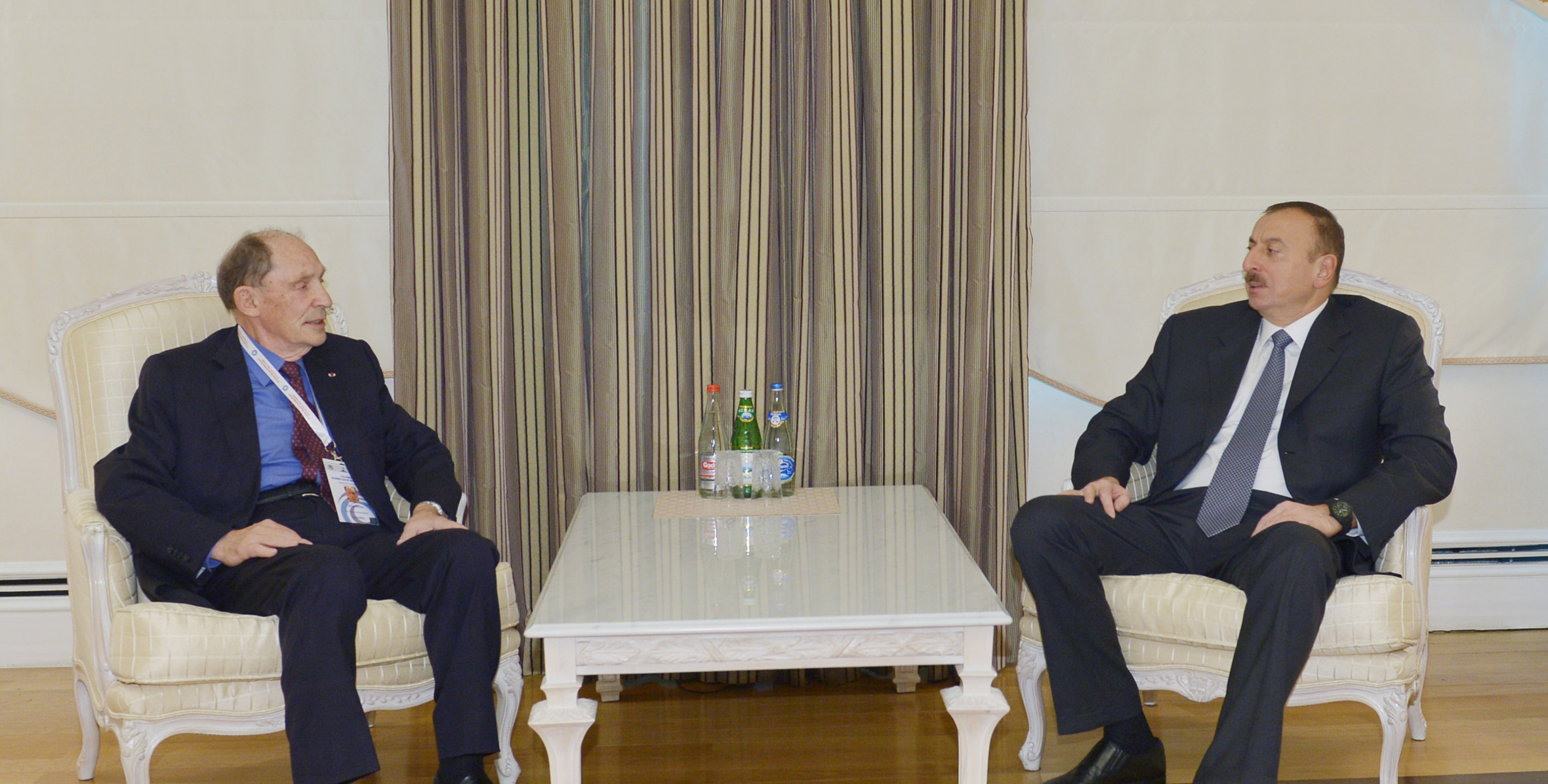
Ribas Reig with President of Azerbaijan Ilham Aliyev, 26 April 2014

After his political career, Ribas Reig returned to work at his family business group, where he was the president of the Banca Reig and vice president of the Agricultural Bank of Andorra, now Andbank. He was also the honorary president of Andbank from 2002 on.

On 30 June 2005, Ribas Reig entered the Spanish Royal Academy of Economic and Financial Sciences in Barcelona, and remained an academician until his death in 2020. On 8 July 2009, the Andorran government named him special ambassador with the mission of developing relations with Europe, an office he held until 2015. In December 2020, Ribas Reig published his memoirs.

Ribas Reig died on 18 December 2020 at the age of 84 in his hometown. On 19 December, the government decreed a national day of mourning. His funeral was held on 20 December in Sant Julià de Lòria's church and presided over by Co-Prince Joan Enric Vives.

== Honorary distinctions ==
- Honoris causa University of the Balearic Islands (1996).
- Commandeur of the Legion of Honour (2010).
- Medal of the Group of Ex-Syndics and Former General Councilors (GESCO) (2018).
- Honoris causa University of Georgia.

Political offices
First Position created	Prime Minister of Andorra; 1982–1984	Succeeded by Josep Pintat-Solans
Preceded by Josep Pintat-Solans	Prime Minister of Andorra; 1990–1994	Succeeded by Marc Forné Molné
