= Alejandro Agag =

Spanish businessman and politician

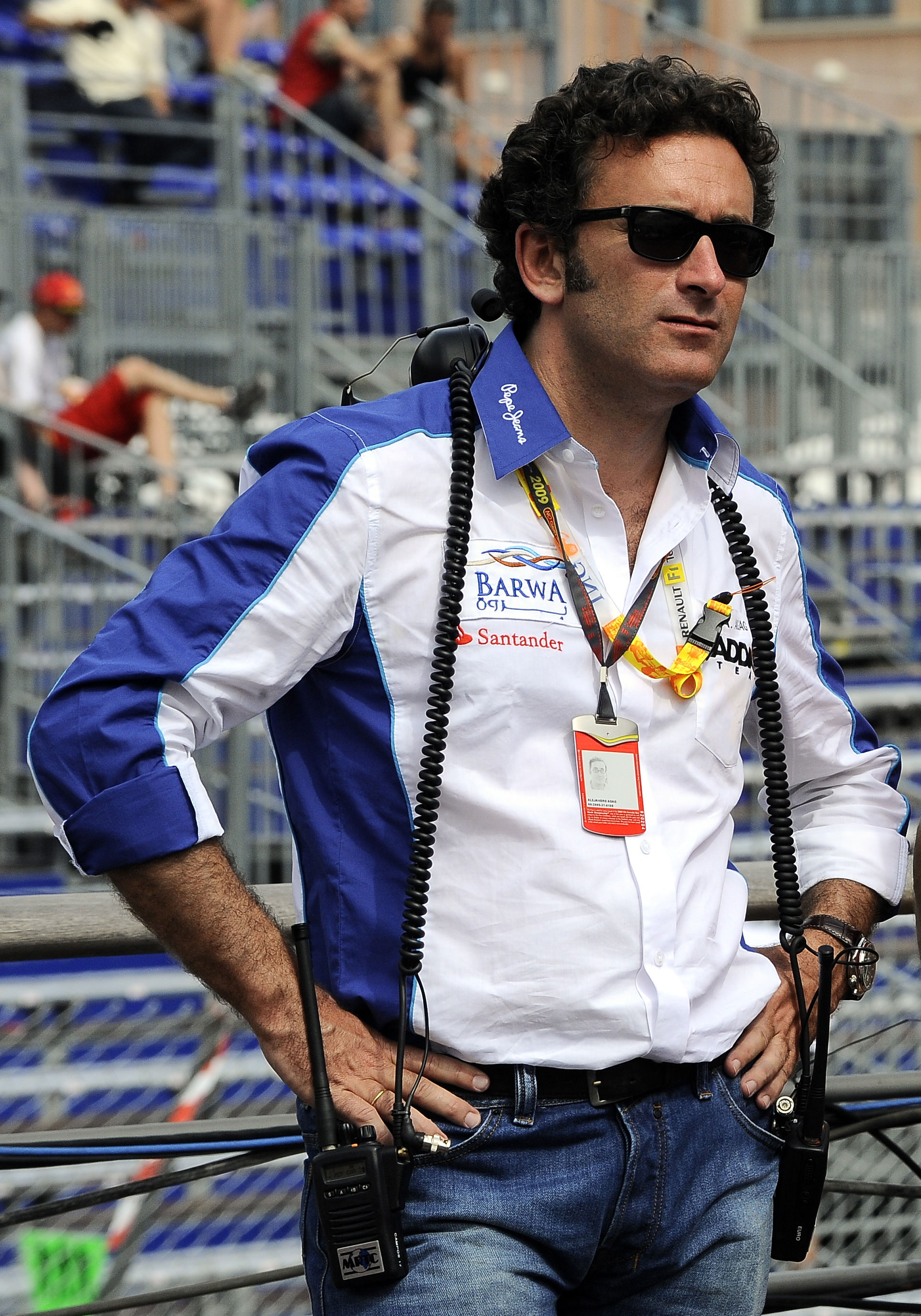
- Agag in 2009
- Born: Alejandro Tarik Agag Longo; Madrid, Spain
- Occupation: Chairman of Addax Capital LLP
- Political party: Partido Popular (MEP)
- Spouse: Ana Aznar Botella (m. 2002)

Alejandro Tarik Agag Longo is a Spanish businessman. He is the Chairman of Addax Capital LLP.

== Early life and education ==
Agag was born in Madrid to an Algerian-Belgian father, Youssef Agag, who was a banker, and a Spanish mother, Soledad Longo Álvarez de Sotomayor. There, he went to Colegio Retamar, Pozuelo de Alarcón, a fee-paying school affiliated with Opus Dei, a Catholic movement. Agag graduated from the Colegio Universitario de Estudios Financieros (CUNEF) in Madrid with a degree in economics and business studies.

== Political career ==
In 1989, Agag joined Nuevas Generaciones (NNGG), the youth organization of the main centre-right Spanish party Partido Popular, which at the time was in the opposition. He joined the international relations department due to his knowledge of multiple languages. During that time, Agag traveled extensively, representing NNGG in organizations such as the Democrat Youth Community of Europe and EYCD. Agag was elected International Secretary of NNGG at their congress in 1994.

In the same year, Agag graduated from university and became Deputy Secretary General of the European People's Party (EPP), an offer that was a direct result of the election of the German Klaus Welle as Secretary General a few months earlier. As Deputy Secretary General, Agag was tasked with coordinating different groups within the EPP and drafting policy papers to be presented at the congress. Agag was a member of the EPP Summit, which includes all of EPP's heads of state and government. Also during that year, Agag ran for a seat in the European Parliament, but did not win.

In 1996, the centre-right won the elections in Spain, and Agag became the political aide of the prime minister at the time, José María Anzar. He spent three years in that position.

In 1999, he was elected a member of the European Parliament for the Partido Popular. He entered the Economic and Monetary Affairs Commission, focusing on antitrust policy. The next year, he led the Parliament's report on antitrust policy and was active in redrafting that policy.

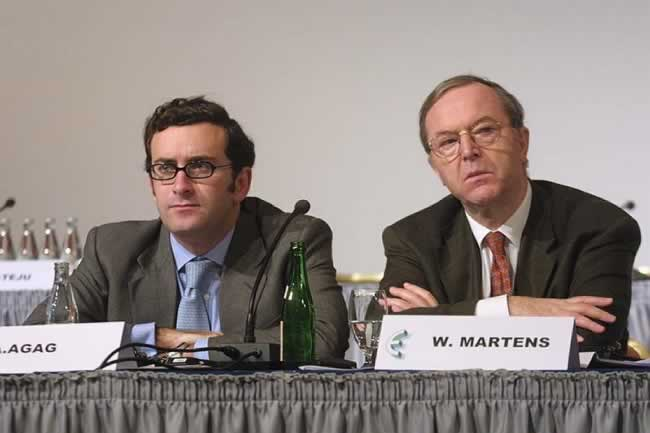
Agag and Wilfried Martens at the European People's Party congress in Berlin

Also in 2000, he was elected Secretary General of the European People's Party, replacing his colleague, Klaus Welle. During his mandate as Secretary General, the organization expanded to Eastern Europe. During that period, it incorporated more than 20 new political parties from that region. Later that year, for the first time, the EPP won the European Parliament elections and became the largest political force in Europe.

Making a controversial decision against some member parties of the EPP, he pushed for the acceptance of Forza Italia, Silvio Berlusconi's party, into the organization. Berlusconi went on to win the 2001 Italian elections.

In 2000, Agag was elected to be the Secretary General of the Christian Democratic International in Mexico, now known as Centrist Democratic International.

In 2001, Agag made a decision to cease his political activities in order to further his career in business and sporting activities. The following year he was succeeded as Secretary General of the EPP by Antonio López-Istúriz. He remained a member of the European Parliament until 2002.

== Business career ==
In 2002, Agag moved to London and started his own consultancy firm. Agag founded a company called Addax Capital LLP, which is regulated by the FSA. Agag is currently Chairman of Addax and was joined in 2009 by Ignacio Muñoz Alonso, former CEO of Rothschild Bank in Spain.

In 2007, the Financial Times named him one of the 10 "shakers and movers" of the Spanish economy, and described him as a "political hopeful, economist, banker and indefatigable dealmaker."

GQ Magazine named him the Spanish Businessman of the Year in 2008.

== Sports ==
Agag's business activity within sports mainly focuses on motorsport and football. According to the Spanish newspaper El País, Agag and Flavio Briatore acquired the Formula One T.V. rights in Spain.

Agag owned the Barwa Addax GP2 Series Team, which won the title in 2008 and was runner-up in 2009. He took over the team from former F1 driver Adrián Campos in mid-2007. The team's main sponsor was the Qatari real estate company Barwa. In 2010, the Addax GP3 Team competed in the GP3 Series.

Through his connection within the sport, Agag has worked with Flavio Briatore, Bernie Ecclestone and Lakshmi Mittal. Together, they bought the English football club Queens Park Rangers (QPR) in 2007.

Agag was chairman of QPR for a few months during the takeover and then remained in the club as a shareholder. QPR was promoted to the English Premier League in 2011.

He is chairman of the Formula E Championship, an electric car racing series. The inaugural season began in September 2014 and lasted until June 2015.

== Personal life ==
On 5 September 2002, Agag married Ana Aznar Botella, the daughter of then-prime minister José María Aznar and politician Ana Botella, at El Escorial in Madrid. Guests included King Juan Carlos I and Queen Sofia of Spain. Former British Prime Minister Tony Blair and Italian Prime Minister Silvio Berlusconi served as witnesses.

Agag is fluent in Spanish, English, French, and Italian.

== Bibliography ==
- Alejandro Agag (2001). "The future of the European people's party". Our vision of Europe: proximity, competitiveness and visibility. Leuvent: Garant. pp. 239–242. ISBN 9789044111804. OCLC 912254670.
