= Centrist Democrat International =

Christian democratic political international

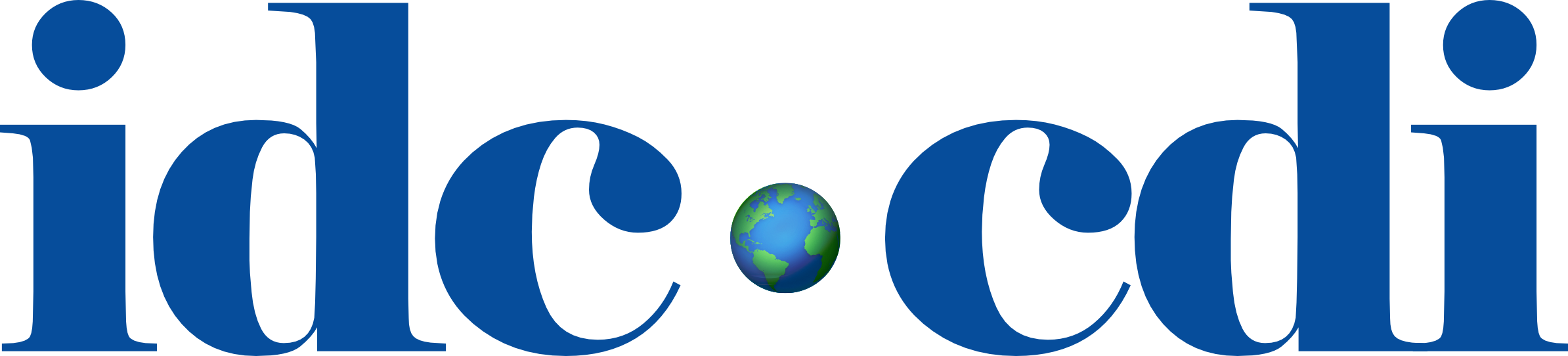
- Abbreviation: CDI (English); IDC (French, Spanish)
- Formation: 30 July 1961
- Type: Political international
- Headquarters: Brussels, Belgium
- Region served: Worldwide
- Members: 109 political parties
- Official languages: French; English; Spanish
- President: Andrés Pastrana Arango
- Subsidiaries: Youth of the Centrist Democrat International
- Affiliations: Christian Democrat Organization of America (ODCA); European People's Party (EPP); National Democratic Institute (NDI); Konrad Adenauer Foundation (KAS)
- Website: idc-cdi.com

The Centrist Democrat International (CDI; Spanish: Internacional Demócrata de Centro, IDC) is a Christian democratic political international.

The CDI was founded on 30 July 1961 in Santiago, Chile, as the Christian Democrat World Union, reflecting the central role that Christian democratic parties played in its foundation. However, over the decades, the CDI has progressively expanded its identity and membership to include parties from a wide range of ideological traditions, and in 1999, it was renamed the Centrist Democrat International due to the participation of groups from other religions.

Today, it represents a broad political family committed to defending and strengthening constitutional democracy as the only viable system for guaranteeing freedom, pluralism, and social justice. To achieve this, the CDI works through its regional organizations.

The CDI's European division is the European People's Party, the largest European political party. Its African equivalent is the regional IDC.Africa, which has its own statutes aligned with the principles of the CDI. The CDI also works with think tanks such as the National Democratic Institute and the Wilfred Martens Centre (WMCES).

== Timeline ==
- December 1925: The first international gathering of Catholic-Christian democratic parties takes place in Paris, establishing the International Secretariat of Democratic Parties of Christian Inspiration (SIPDIC). Member parties were from Belgium, Germany, Italy, France, the Netherlands, Luxembourg, Austria, Switzerland, Czechoslovakia, Hungary, Spain, Portugal, and Lithuania.
- 1939 to 1945: World War II suspends the SIPDIC.
- 23 April 1947: Political leaders from Argentina, Brazil, Chile, and Uruguay meet in Montevideo to create an international organization of Christian democratic parties. Representatives from Bolivia and Peru participate via diplomatic correspondence. The Declaration of Montevideo establishes the Organización Demócrata Cristiana de América (ODCA), although the name is not formalized until their second meeting in July 1949.
- 3 June 1947: European Christian Democrats form the Nouvelles Équipes Internationales (NEI) in Chaudfontaine, Belgium, prompted by the Swiss a year before restarting the SIPDIC. The NEI, open to non-Catholic parties who subscribed to the principles of social democracy, sees European integration as the best way to prevent the spread of communism into western Europe and encourages exile groups from Bulgaria, Romania, Lithuania, Hungary, Poland, Czechoslovakia, and Yugoslavia to attend. The NEI plays a significant role in preparations for the Hague Congress and the establishment of the European Coal and Steel Community.
- 26 July 1950: The Christian Democratic Union of Central Europe (CDUCE) is formed in New York City to assist Christian democratic parties in exile by organizing forces in opposition to communism. By 1955, it begins working with underground operatives in the Soviet bloc while trying to coordinate efforts between European and Latin American Christian Democratic parties.
- May and July 1956: The ODCA, NEI, and CDUCE meet for the first time in Paris at a gathering of 33 delegations from 28 countries to discuss the creation of a global Christian democratic organization.
- 1960: The three regional Christian democratic organizations establish the Christian Democratic International Information and Documentation Centre (CDI-IDC) in Rome to provide political analyses for Christian democratic parties around the world.
- 1961: The World Union of Christian Democrats (WUCD) is established in Santiago.
- 1982: The WUCD changes its name to the Christian Democrat International (CDI).
- 1999: The CDI changes its name to the Centrist Democrat International due to the increasing membership of non-Christian political parties. Since October 2000, some have informally referred to the CDI as the Christian Democrat and People's Parties International.
- 2021: The CDI underwent change in its legal and constitutive form, increasing its political, communicative and organisational skills.

== Executive committee ==
The CDI Executive Committee consists of the President, Secretary-general, and Vice-presidents. The President is Andrés Pastrana Arango, former President of Colombia and the Secretary-General is MEP Antonio López-Istúriz of Spain.

Members of the executive committee are:

- Andrés Pastrana Arango (Colombia) – President
- Antonio López-Istúriz (Spain) – Secretary-General
- Mariana Gómez del Campo (Mexico) – Vice-president
- Maria Eugenia Vidal (Argentina) – Vice-president
- Antonio Brito (Brazil) – Vice-president
- Juan Carlos Hidalgo (Costa Rica)- Vice-president
- Alfredo Barnechea (Peru) – Vice-president
- Janez Janša (Slovenia) – Vice-president
- Viktor Orbán (Hungary) – Vice-president
- Andrej Plenković (Croatia) – Vice-president
- Sali Berisha (Albania) – Vice-president
- Yara Suos (Cambodia) – Vice-president
- Muhaimin Iskandar (Indonesia) – Vice-president
- Samy Gemayel (Lebanon) – Vice-president
- Adalberto Costa Jr. (Angola) – Vice-president
- Anne Désirée Ouloto (Ivory Coast) – Vice-president
- Nizar Baraka (Morocco) – Vice-president
- Albert Pahimi (Chad) – Vice-president
- Pier Ferdinando Casini (Italy) – Honorary President
- José María Aznar (Spain) – Honorary President
- Ofelia Acevedo (Cuba) – Honorary Vice-president
- Mario David (Portugal) – Honorary Vice-president
- Ulisses Correia e Silva (Cape Verde) – Vice-president ex-officio
- Manfred Weber (Germany) – Vice-president ex officio

== Member parties ==
Country	Party	Abbr	Government	Lower Chamber	Upper Chamber
Albania	Democratic Party of Albania	PD	Opposition	50 / 140 (36%)	
Algeria	National Rally for Democracy	RND	Junior party in coalition	58 / 407 (14%)	21 / 144 (15%)
Angola	National Union for the Total Independence of Angola	UNITA	Opposition	90 / 220 (41%)	
Argentina	Christian Democratic Party	PDC	Extraparliamentary opposition	0 / 257 (0%)	0 / 72 (0%)
Armenia	Rule of Law	OEK	Extraparliamentary opposition	0 / 107 (0%)	
Armenia	Republican Party of Armenia	RPA	Opposition	4 / 107 (4%)	
Aruba	Aruban People's Party	AVP/PPA	Government	9 / 21 (43%)	
Bangladesh	Bangladesh Nationalist Party	BNP	Government	208 / 350 (59%)	
Belgium	Christian Democratic and Flemish	CD&V	Junior party in coalition	11 / 150 (7%)	5 / 60 (8%)
Botswana	Botswana National Front	BNF	Government	22 / 65 (34%)	
Brazil	Brazilian Social Democracy Party	PSDB	Opposition	14 / 513 (3%)	1 / 81 (1%)
Burkina Faso	Union for the Republic	UR	Opposition	0 / 127 (0%)	
Cambodia	National United Front for an Independent, Neutral, Peaceful, and Cooperative Cambodia	FUNCINPEC	Neither government nor opposition	5 / 125 (4%)	2 / 62 (3%)
Cambodia	Cambodian People's Party	CPP	Government	120 / 125 (96%)	55 / 62 (89%)
Cape Verde	Movement for Democracy	MPD	Government	38 / 72 (53%)	
Chile	Christian Democratic Party	PDC	Opposition	8 / 155 (5%)	3 / 50 (6%)
Chile	National Renewal	RN	Government	13 / 155 (8%)	10 / 50 (20%)
Republic of China	Kuomintang	KMT	Opposition	52 / 113 (46%)	
Colombia	Colombian Conservative Party	PCC	Government	25 / 188 (13%)	15 / 108 (14%)
Colombia	New Democratic Force	NFD	Opposition	0 / 187	0 / 108
Colombia	Democratic Center	CD	Opposition	15 / 188 (8%)	13 / 108 (12%)
Colombia	Colombia Justa Libres	CJL	Opposition	0 / 188	1 / 108
Democratic Republic of the Congo	Movement for the Liberation of the Congo	MLC	Opposition	19 / 500 (4%)	4 / 108 (4%)
Costa Rica	Social Christian Unity Party	PUSC	Opposition	9 / 57 (16%)	
Croatia	Croatian Democratic Union	HDZ	Government	55 / 151 (36%)	
Cuba	Christian Liberation Movement	MCL	Extraparliamentary opposition	0 / 470 (0%)	
Cuba	Christian Democratic Party of Cuba	PDCC	Extraparliamentary opposition	0 / 470 (0%)	
Curaçao	National People's Party	NVP/PNP	Opposition	4 / 21 (19%)	
Cyprus	Democratic Rally	DISY	Opposition	17 / 56 (30%)	
Czech Republic	KDU-ČSL	KDU–ČSL	Opposition	16 / 200 (8%)	12 / 81 (15%)
Dominican Republic	Social Christian Reformist Party	PRSC	Opposition	4 / 190 (2%)	1 / 32 (3%)
Dominican Republic	Dominicans for Change	DxC	Junior party in coalition	2 / 190	1 / 32
El Salvador	Christian Democratic Party	PDC	Opposition	1 / 84 (1%)	
France	The Republicans	LR	Opposition	52 / 577 (9%)	121 / 348 (35%)
Gabon	Gabonese Democratic Party	PDG	Opposition	98 / 143 (69%)	
Georgia	European Georgia — Movement for Liberty		Extraparliamentary opposition	0 / 150	
Germany	Christian Democratic Union	CDU	Government	164 / 630 (26%)	19 / 69 (28%)
Greece	New Democracy	ND	Government	156 / 300 (52%)	
Guinea	Parti de l'espoir pour le développement national	PEDN	Extraparliamentary opposition		
Guinea-Bissau	Party for Social Renewal	PRS	Opposition	12 / 102 (12%)	
Equatorial Guinea	Popular Action of Equatorial Guinea	APGE	Extraparliamentary opposition	0 / 100 (0%)	0 / 70 (0%)
Hungary	Fidesz – Hungarian Civic Alliance	FIDESZ	Opposition	44 / 199 (22%)	
Hungary	Christian Democratic People's Party	KDNP	Opposition	8 / 199 (4%)	
Indonesia	National Awakening Party	PKB	Junior party in coalition	68 / 580 (12%)	
Ireland	Fine Gael	FG	Government	38 / 160 (24%)	17 / 60 (28%)
Italy	Union of the Centre	UDC	Junior party in coalition	1 / 400 (0.3%)	1 / 200 (0.5%)
Italy	Associative Movement of Italians Abroad	MAIE	Junior party in coalition	1 / 400	1 / 400
Ivory Coast	Rally of the Republicans	RDR	Government	127 / 255 (50%)	
Kenya	Wiper Democratic Movement – Kenya	WDM-K	Opposition	25 / 349 (7%)	3 / 67 (4%)
Lebanon	Kataeb	Phalange	Government	4 / 128 (3%)	
Madagascar	Malagasy Miara-Miainga	MMM	Opposition		
Malawi	Malawi Congress Party	MCP	Government	55 / 193 (28%)	
Mali	Union for the Republic and Democracy	URD	Extraparliamentary opposition	19 / 147 (13%)	
Malta	Nationalist Party	PN	Opposition	37 / 79 (47%)	
Mauritania	Union for Democracy and Progress	UDP	Junior party in coalition	10 / 176 (6%)	
Mauritania	Equity Party	El Insaf	Government	107 / 176 (61%)	
Mauritius	Parti Mauricien Social Democrate	PMSD	Opposition	1 / 66	
Mexico	National Action Party	PAN	Opposition	70 / 500 (14%)	21 / 128 (16%)
Montenegro	Europe Now!	PES!	Government	20 / 81 (25%)	
Morocco	Istiqlal Party		Junior party in coalition	81 / 395 (21%)	24 / 120 (20%)
Mozambique	Democratic Movement of Mozambique	MDM	Opposition	8 / 250 (3%)	
Panama	People's Party	PP	Opposition	2 / 71 (3%)	
Paraguay	Christian Democratic Party	PDC	Opposition	0 / 80 (0%)	0 / 45 (0%)
Peru	Christian People's Party	PPC	Extraparliamentary opposition	0 / 130 (0%)	
Philippines	Fight of Democratic Filipinos	LDP	Junior party in coalition	1 / 316 (0.3%)	0 / 24 (0%)
Philippines	Lakas-Christian Muslim Democrats	Lakas	Senior party in coalition	111 / 316 (35%)	1 / 24 (4%)
Portugal	Social Democratic Party	PSD	Government	89 / 230 (39%)	
Romania	National Liberal Party	PNL	Senior party in coalition	49 / 330 (15%)	22 / 136 (16%)
Romania	Democratic Alliance of Hungarians in Romania	RMDSZ	Junior party in coalition	23 / 330 (7%)	10 / 136 (7%)
San Marino	Sammarinese Christian Democratic Party	PDCS	Government	22 / 60 (37%)	
São Tomé and Príncipe	Independent Democratic Action	ADI	Government	30 / 55 (55%)	
Senegal	Centrist Union of Senegal	UCS	Junior party in government		
Senegal	Bloc des centristes Gaïndé	BCG	Opposition		
Serbia	Alliance of Vojvodina Hungarians	VMSZ	In coalition	6 / 250	
Slovenia	New Slovenia	NSi	Opposition	8 / 90 (9%)	
Slovenia	Slovenian Democratic Party	SDS	Opposition	24 / 90 (27%)	
Spain	People's Party	PP	Opposition	137 / 350 (39%)	140 / 266 (53%)
Sweden	Christian Democrats	KD	Government	19 / 349 (5%)	
Ukraine	Party of Hungarians of Ukraine	KMKSZ	Extraparliamentary	0 / 450	
Venezuela	Christian Social Party 'Copei'	COPEI	Opposition	1 / 277 (0.4%)	
Venezuela	Justice First	PJ	Extraparliamentary	0 / 277 (0%)	

== Former members ==
- Andorra – Andorran Democratic Centre
- Andorra – New Centre (Catalan: Nou Centre, NC) (until 2011)
- Argentina – Justicialist Party (Spanish: Partido Justicialista, PJ) (until 2020s)
- Belgium – Humanist Democratic Centre
- Ecuador – Christian Democratic Union
- Estonia – Pro Patria Union
- France – Union for a Popular Movement
- Hungary – Hungarian Democratic Forum
- Italy – Union of Democrats for Europe
- Nicaragua – Conservative Party
- North Macedonia – Internal Macedonian Revolutionary Organization – People's Party
- Panama – Panameñista Party
- Rwanda – National Revolutionary Movement for Development
- Slovakia – Slovak Democratic and Christian Union – Democratic Party
- Spain – Democratic Union of Catalonia
- Switzerland – Christian Democratic People's Party of Switzerland
- Ukraine – Batkivshchyna

== Observer parties ==
The IDC-CDI has 21 observers, including:

- Armenia – Heritage (Armenian: Ժառանգություն)
- Azerbaijan – New Azerbaijan Party (Azerbaijani: Yeni Azərbaycan Partiyası, YAP)
- Belarus – Belarusian Christian Democracy (Belarusian: Беларуская хрысьціянская дэмакратыя, BKhD)
- Belarus - BPF Party (Belarusian: Партыя БНФ)
- Bolivia - Christian Democratic Party (Bolivia) (Spanish: Partido Demócrata Cristiano, PDC)
- Bonaire - Bonaire Patriotic Union (Papiamentu: Union Patriótiko Boneriano, UPB; Dutch: Patriottische Unie van Bonaire)
- Brazil – Brazilian Social Democracy Party (Brazilian Portuguese: Partido da Social Democracia Brasileira, PSDB)
- Costa Rica - Social Christian Unity Party (Spanish: Partido Unidad Social Cristiana, PUSC)
- Equatorial Guinea – Popular Union of Equatorial Guinea (Spanish: Partido Unión Popular, PUP)
- Equatorial Guinea – Democratic Party of Equatorial Guinea (Spanish: Partido Democrático de Guinea Ecuatorial, PDGE)
- Honduras - Christian Democratic Party of Honduras (Spanish: Partido Demócrata Cristiano de Honduras, PDC)
- Honduras – National Party of Honduras (Spanish: Partido Nacional de Honduras, PNH)
- Kosovo - Democratic League of Kosovo (Albanian: Lidhja Demokratike e Kosovës, LDK)
- Lithuania - Homeland Union – Lithuanian Christian Democrats (Lithuanian: Tėvynės sąjunga – Lietuvos krikščionys demokratai, TS-LKD)
- Mauritania - Republican Party for Democracy and Renewal (French: Parti républicain démocratique et social, PRDS)
- Mozambique – Mozambican National Resistance (Portuguese: Resistência Nacional Moçambicana, RENAMO)
- Slovakia – Christian Democratic Movement (Slovak: Kresťanskodemokratické hnutie, KDH), Hungarian Alliance (Slovak: Maďarská aliancia, Szövetség–Aliancia)
- Trinidad and Tobago - United National Congress
- Uganda - Democratic Party (Uganda) (Swahili: Chama cha Kidemokrasia, DP)
- Uruguay - Christian Democratic Party of Uruguay (Spanish: Partido Demócrata Cristiano del Uruguay)
- Uruguay - Partido Nacional

== See also ==
- Christian Democrat Organization of America
- European People's Party
- Wilfried Martens Centre
- National Democratic Institute
- Konrad Adenauer Stiftung
- International Democracy Union
- Liberal International
- Andres Pastrana
- Antonio Lopez Isturiz
