= 1978 Andorran supplementary parliamentary election =

- 21 July 1978
- 4 of the 28 seats in the General Council
| Party | Vote % | Seats |
|---|---|---|
| Independents | 100 | 4 |
This lists parties that won seats. See the complete results below.

Supplementary elections were held in Andorra on 21 July 1978 to elect four members to the General Council. The elections took place following the creation of the parish of Escaldes–Engordany by splitting the parish of Andorra la Vella. The General Council had four members for each parish, and so was increased in size from 24 to 28 seats. Of the four members previously representing the parish of Andorra la Vella, two represented the town of Andorra la Vella and two represented Les Escaldes. As a result of the split of the parish, two additional members were elected from Andorra la Vella and two from Escaldes–Engordany so that each would have four members.

The four elected members would serve until the regularly scheduled 1981 elections.

== Electoral system ==
All candidates had to run on lists, but voters could split between candidates on different lists. Any candidate receiving a majority of the vote was elected in the first round. If there were remaining seats to fill, a second round was held, in which candidates had to receive a majority of the vote to be elected. If there were still remaining seats to fill, a third round would be held in which the candidate(s) with the most votes would be elected.

== Results ==
Francesc Cerqueda Pasquet and Jaume Bartomeu Canturri were elected in Andorra la Vella, defeating Benet Pantebre Martínez and Lluís Viu Torres. Estanislau Sangrà Font and Marcel Besolí Bacó were elected in Escaldes-Engordany, defeating Jaume Casal Vall and Antoni Aristot Gomà.

Voter turnout was 74% in Andorra la Vella and 72% in Escaldes–Engordany.
