= Democratic Renewal (Andorra) =

Democratic Renewal Renovació Democràtica
- Abbreviation: RD
- Leader: Ricard de Haro
- Founded: 2005
- Dissolved: September 2011
- Split from: Democratic Party
- Headquarters: Andorra la Vella
- Ideology: Social liberalism
- Political position: Centre to centre-left
- Colours: Green, Black, Orange, White

Democratic Renewal (Catalan: Renovació Democràtica, RD) was a social-liberal political party in Andorra.

== History ==
For the 2005 parliamentary elections, the party was part of an alliance with the Social Democratic Party and Parochial Union of Independents Group named L'Alternativa. The alliance won twelve seats.

The party did not contest the 2009 elections but instead supported Andorra for Change, which won three seats. It did not participate in the 2011 elections. The party was dissolved in September 2011.
