= National Andorran Coalition =

Defunct political party of Andorra

The National Andorran Coalition (Catalan: Coalició Nacional d'Andorra, CNA) was a political party in Andorra.

== History ==
The party was established in 1993 after political parties were legalised. In the elections that year it received 17% of the vote and won two seats in the General Council. However, the party did not contest any further national elections.
