= New Centre (Andorra) =

New Centre Nou Centre
- Founded: 2005
- Dissolved: 22 February 2011
- Merged into: Democrats for Andorra
- Headquarters: Andorra la Vella
- Ideology: Christian democracy Conservatism
- Political position: Centre-right
- International affiliation: Centrist Democrat International
- Colours: Black

Website
- noucentreandorra.com

The New Centre (Catalan: Nou Centre, NC) was a Christian-democratic political party in Andorra. The party was founded in 2005 as a merger between the Andorran Democratic Centre and Century 21 political parties after they had been in an electoral alliance since 2001. For the 2009 Andorran parliamentary election, the party joined the centre-right Reformist Coalition, which gained 11 seats in the General Council of the Valleys.
