= Democratic Party (Andorra) =

Defunct political party of Andorra

Democratic Party Partit Demòcrata
- Abbreviation: PD
- Founded: 2001
- Split from: National Democratic Group; Democratic National Initiative
- Ideology: Christian democracy

The Democratic Party (Catalan: Partit Demòcrata, PD) was a Christian-democratic political party in Andorra. Its final election was the 2001 Andorran parliamentary election.

== History ==
The party was established in the run-up to the 2001 elections when the National Democratic Group split in two, with the Social Democratic Party also being formed. The new party received 22.7% of the vote and won five seats.

Thereafter, the party did not contest any further elections. Their former candidates Enric Tarrado Vives and Julià Call i Raig joined the Andorran Democratic Centre–Century 21 coalition while Patrick Garcia Ricart led the Democratic Renewal list.
