= Antonio López-Istúriz White =

Spanish politician

Antonio López-Istúriz White MEP
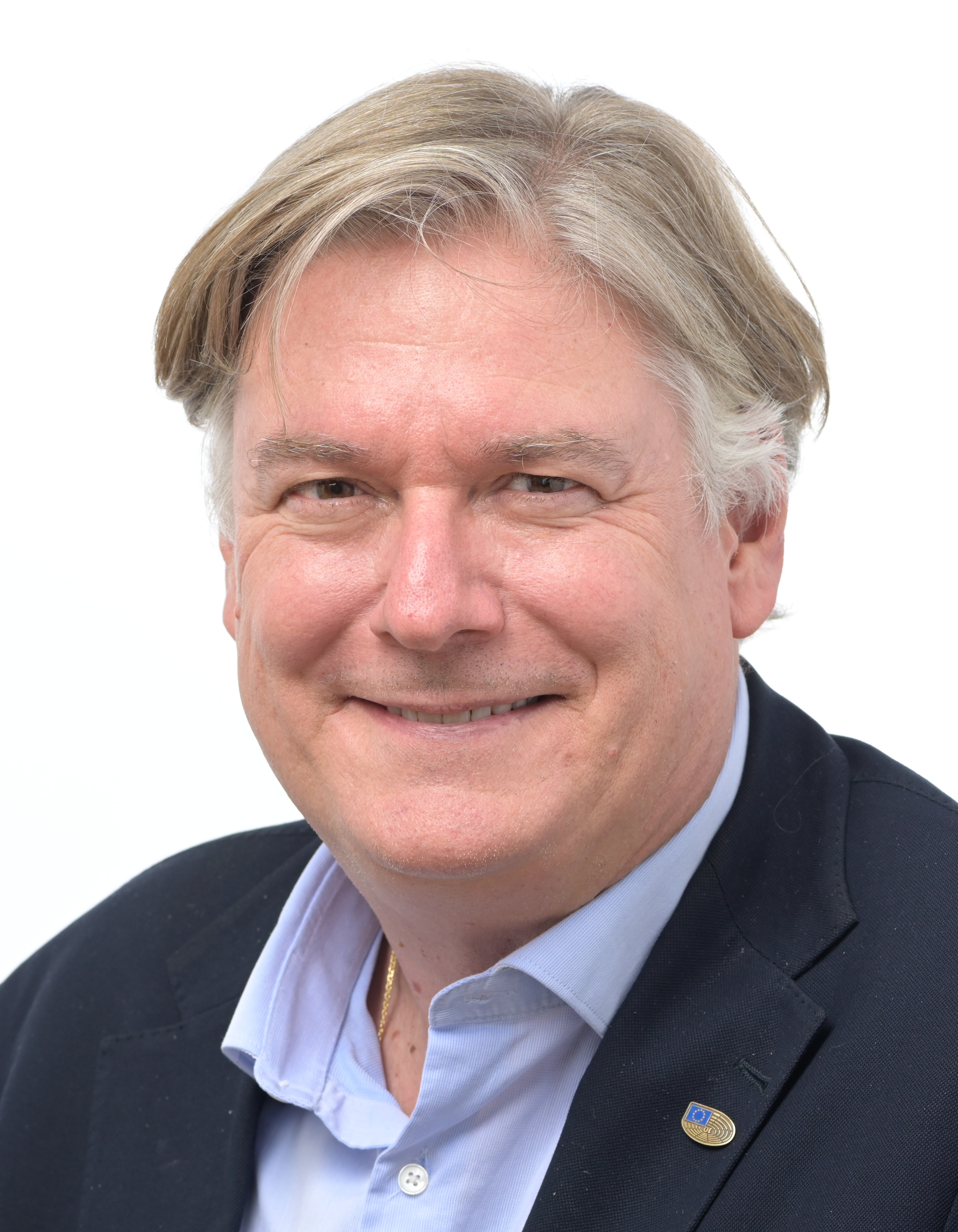

Secretary General of the European People's Party
- In office 5 March 2002 – 31 May 2022
- President: Joseph Daul; Donald Tusk
- Preceded by: Alejandro Agag
- Succeeded by: Thanasis Bakolas
- Constituency: Spain

Member of the European Parliament
- Incumbent
- Assumed office 1 July 2004

Personal details
- Born: 1 April 1970 (age 56) Pamplona, Spain
- Party: People's Party
- Other political affiliations: European People's Party
- Children: 2
- Education: CEU San Pablo University; University of Navarra

Antonio López-Istúriz White (Spanish pronunciation: [anˈtonjo ˈlopeθ isˈtuɾiθ ˈɣwajt]; born 1 April 1970) is a Spanish politician and Member of the European Parliament (MEP) from Spain. He is a member of the People's Party, member party of the European People's Party. He has been the secretary general of the European People's Party since March 2002 till May 2022.

He is also a member of the executive committee of the Spanish People's Party, member of the Committee of Rights and Guarantees], Executive Secretary of the Centrist Democrat International and secretary-treasurer of the Wilfried Martens Centre for European Studies, the think-tank of the EPP.

== Early life and education ==
López-Istúriz was born in Pamplona, Navarre, to a Spanish father and an American mother. When he was still a child, his family moved to Palma de Mallorca, Balearic Islands.

In his youth, he moved to Madrid to study law at the CEU San Pablo Catholic University, where he also received a degree in economic studies. He later studied at IESE Business School of the University of Navarra.

Aside from native-level Spanish, he also speaks English, French, and Italian.

== Political career ==
During his years at the university, he began his involvement in politics by becoming a member of Nuevas Generaciones, the youth organization of the People's Party.

Between 1996 and 1997 he was coordinator of the education and culture section of the People's Party in the Autonomous Community of Madrid.

In 1997 he moved to Brussels to work as an assistant to the People's Party delegation at the European Parliament until 1999, when he was called by the President of the Spanish Government at the time José María Aznar to become his political assistant.

In 2002 he returned to Brussels as Secretary-General of the European People’s Party. Two years later he was elected Member of the European Parliament (MEP) running on the lists of Partido Popular.

=== Member of the European Parliament ===
==== First term 2004-2009 ====
In his first term as MEP he was a member of the Legal Affairs Committee and a substitute member of the Transport Committee, as well as a member of the ACP-EU Parliamentary Assembly, a substitute in the Foreign Affairs Committee and a substitute in the Delegation for relations with Albania, Bosnia Herzegovina and Serbia - Montenegro.

==== Second term 2009-2014 ====
Re-elected Member of the European Parliament in 2009, he continued to work as a member of the Legal Affairs Committee and as a substitute in the Foreign and Transport Affairs Committee as well as a member of the ACP-EU Parliamentary Assembly, a substitute in the Subcommittee on Security and Defense and in the delegation for relations with the countries of South-East Europe and for relations with the United States.

==== Third term 2014-2019 ====
In the 2014 elections he was re-elected for a third term. He was a member of the Internal Market and Consumer Protection Committee, as well as a substitute on the Foreign Affairs Committee, subcommittee on Security and Defence, delegation to Relations with Israel, delegation for relations with the United States and the delegation of the Parliamentary Assembly for the Union for the Mediterranean. In 2014, he was elected President of the Parliamentary Group of Friends European Union-United Arab Emirates.

López-Istúriz was rapporteur on the proposal for a Regulation of the European Parliament and of the council on cableway installations, and alternative rapporteur for the report on EU-China relations and on reports for which the Parliament issues an opinion "Establish a new agreement for energy consumers" and "European Energy Security Strategy". He was also alternative rapporteur on Cyber Defense and on Political Cooperation with Singapore.

==== Fourth term 2019-2024 ====
Following the 2019 elections he was re-elected for a fourth term. Currently, he is a member of the Foreign Affairs Committee and Chairman of the Delegation for the Relations with Israel. He is also member of the Delegation for Relations with the Arab Peninsula as well as substitute in the subcommittee on Security and Defense and the delegation for relations with the United States. He will continue in his role as President of the Parliamentary Group of Friends European Union-United Arab Emirates.

==== Fourth term 2024- ====
In the 2024 elections he was re-elected for a fifth term. He is a member of the Committee on Foreign Affairs (AFET), the Committee on Constitutional affairs and the subcommittee on Human Rights (DROI). He is the chair of the Delegation to the EU-Mexico Joint Parliamentary Committee. He serves on the Delegation for relations with Israel and the Delegation for relations with the Arab Peninsula. He is a substitute member of the Committee on Economic and Monetary Affairs (ECON) and on the Delegation for relations with the United States as well as the Delegation to the Euro-Latin American Parliamentary Assembly.

=== European People's Party ===
Antonio López-Istúriz was the Secretary General of the European People's Party (EPP) from 2002 to 2022. He was elected to this position in 2002 in Estoril on an interim basis and confirmed at the 2004 Brussels Congress, being re-elected at the 2006 Rome, Bonn 2009, Bucharest 2012 and Madrid 2015 Congresses.

During the statutory congress held on October 21 and 22, 2015 in Madrid, López-Istúriz was re-elected Secretary General for the fourth time.

=== IDC-CDI ===
In 2002, under the leadership of the President of the Government of Spain at the time, José María Aznar, he was elected executive secretary of the Centrist Democratic International (IDC-CDI), which brings together 100 political parties from 49 countries. He continues to hold this position, working with the current president of the organization, the former President of Colombia, Andrés Pastrana.

== Defense of children's rights ==
Antonio López-Istúriz White is vice-president of ANAR Foundation. In its efforts to support children, López-Istúriz helped to promote the Helpline for Children and Adolescents to cover the whole of Spain. In 2015 he became "Champion of Children's Rights" for his work and commitment to the rights of children. He was also one of the promoters of the Written Declaration on Investing in Children which was approved on December 7, 2015, with 428 signatures from MEPs, a record number in the European Parliament.

== Defense rights of the disabled and the elderly ==
Since 2000, he has been Vocal of the Board of Trustees of the AEQUITAS Foundation, an organization created by the General Council of the Spanish Notaries in order to provide free legal services to people who for reasons of age, physical or mental illness, or membership of certain socially-disadvantaged groups, are in need of special protection. Within the scope of his parliamentary activity, he was rapporteur of the European Parliament report that addressed issues such as vulnerability in old age and measures to support the elderly and disabled.

== Transatlantic relations ==
As a member of the respective delegation in the European Parliament and also as Secretary-General of the European People’s Party, López-Istúriz travels frequently to the United States and holds meetings with politicians and other civil society actors. In July 2018, he spoke in front of the Republican Study Committee (RSC), a caucus of conservative members of the Republican Party in the United States House of Representatives.

Besides holding several meetings with the late Senator McCain, who was also the president of the International Republican Institute, López-Istúriz has met with Republicans such as Senator Marco Rubio and Congressmen Paul Ryan, Chris Smith, Ileana Ros-Lehtinen and Mario Díaz-Balart. Along with the latest two and with former congressman Lincoln Díaz-Balart, he has developed initiatives and activities in favor of Cuban democracy.

He has also met Democrat representatives, such as Congressman Albio Sires and Congresswoman Debbie Wasserman-Schultz, a number of Presidents of the Democratic National Committee, and with some advisors of the President Obama such as Rick Holtzapple (who was Head of European Affairs of the White House), Mike Froman (Obama's advisor for security affairs) and Miriam Sapiro (Responsible for commerce affairs at the Obama's Administration). In 2016, he attended the Democratic National Convention in Philadelphia witnessing the nomination of Hillary Clinton.

== Distinctions and awards ==
- 2014 - Commander of the Order of the Star (Italy)
- 2013 - Parliamentarian Prize - MEP of the Year - awarded by Spanish Parliamentarian Journalists Association
- 2002 - Officer of the Order of Bernardo O'Higgins (Chile)
- 2000 - Recipient of the Order of the Star (Jordan)
