= 1983 Andorran local elections =

The 1983 Andorran local elections were held on 12 December. Voters elected the council members of the seven parishes of Andorra. For first time since 1867, local elections were not hold on the same day as parliamentary elections. This was also the first time that the totality of the council seats were up for election (between 1867 and 1979 only half of the seats were renewed in each election).

== Electoral system ==
A referendum was held in 1982 to choose a new election system, but any option had a majority of the votes, and therefore the traditional majority system remained.

Candidates were elected using a two-round plurality-at-large voting system with open lists. As parties were not legalised until 1993, all the lists were officially labelled as independent, although media classified them as government endorsed (if the list was supported by the outgoing government) or opposition (if candidates were part of the opposition). After the elections, the parish councils elected the consol major (mayor) and the cònsol menor (deputy mayor), which normally were the top candidates of the winning list.

== Candidates ==
In Canillo and Sant Julià de Lòria only one list was running. In la Massana, the top candidate of both lists was the same person.

Candidates by parish. The two top candidates are listed for each list:

- Canillo
  - Government endorsed: Xavier Jordana, Joan Puigfernal
  - Opposition: Miquel Naudi, Daniel Mateu
- Encamp
  - Enric Pujal, Josep Dalleres
- Ordino
  - Government endorsed: Joan Solana, Pere Babi
  - Opposition: Julià Vila, Pere Riba
- La Massana
  - Bonaventura Mora, Candi Naudi
  - Bonaventura Mora, Jordi Font
- Andorra la Vella
  - Government endorsed: Manuel Pons, Antoni Cerqueda
  - Opposition: Jordi Farràs, Jaume Bartumeu
- Sant Julià de Lòria
  - Josep Maria Felipó, Alfredo Figueredo
- Escaldes-Engordany
  - Government endorsed: Joan Nadal, Serafí Miró
  - Opposition: José María Beal, Miquel Aleix

== Results ==
Turnout was 77.7%, 14.6 pp higher than in the previous election. Turnout was lower in the parishes with only one candidacy (59% in Encamp and 66% in Sant Julià de Lòria). All candidates were elected on the first round.

Results by parish:

Parish	Winning list
Canillo	No overall control
Encamp	Enric Pujal (government endorsed)
Ordino	Joan Solana
La Massana	No overall control
Andorra la Vella	Manuel Pons (government endorsed)
Sant Julià de Lòria	Josep Maria Felipó
Escaldes-Engordany	José María Beal (opposition)
