= Andorra for Change =

Andorra for Change Andorra pel Canvi
- Abbreviation: APC
- Founder: Eusebi Nomen
- Founded: 2008
- Dissolved: 2020
- Headquarters: Andorra la Vella
- Ideology: Economic liberalism Fiscal conservatism
- Political position: Centre
- Colours: Blue, Red, Grey

Website
- www.andorrapelcanvi.com

Andorra for Change (Catalan: Andorra pel Canvi, APC) was a political party in Andorra. The party was in favor of the country remaining a tax haven, and as such was against alterations to the tax system that would take that status away.

== History ==
The party was established in 2008 under the leadership of businessman Eusebi Nomen Calvet, and contested the elections the following year. Supported by Democratic Renewal, the APC won three seats. The party initially supported the Social Democratic Party government of Jaume Bartumeu, but later withdrew its support, resulting in the government having problems passing the budget. After the 2011 budget was rejected by the General Council, early elections were called. In those elections, the party lost all three seats. The party did not contest any further elections, and party founder Eusebi Nomen Calvet left to found the souverainist Sovereign Andorra on 20 January 2019, running in Canillo in the elections later that year. The list did not win any seats. APC's trademark on its name and logo expired on 22 January 2020, with no renewal made, leaving the party effectively defunct.
