= 2005 Micronesian general election =

2005 Micronesian parliamentary election
- 8 March 2005

10 out of 14 seats in Congress

Parliamentary elections were held in the Federated States of Micronesia on 8 March 2005, alongside a three-part referendum. As no political parties existed, all 23 candidates for the 10 available seats in Congress ran as Independents.

In the referendums voters were asked whether they approved of three proposed amendments to the constitution. These would remove the power of the Supreme Court to rule on land and water issues, give the states credit for their acts, and lift the ban on dual citizenship. The proposed amendments required a 75% majority in at least three of the four states. However, the Supreme Court proposal failed to pass the threshold in all four states, whilst only Chuuk State had over 75% in favour of the other two proposals.

== Results ==
=== Congress ===
Party	Seats
Independents	14
Total	14
Source: IPU

=== Referendums ===
==== Supreme Court ====
It is hereby proposed that Article XI, Section 6 of the Constitution of the Federated States of Micronesia be amended and read as follows:

Section 6
(a) The trial division of the Supreme Court has original and exclusive jurisdiction in cases affecting officials of foreign governments, disputes between states, admiralty or maritime cases, and in cases in which the national government is a party except where an interest in land is at issue.
(b) The national courts, including the trial division of the Supreme Court, have concurrent original jurisdiction in cases arising
(i) Under this Constitution
(ii) Under national laws and treaties, and
(iii) From disputes between a state and a citizen of citizen of another state, between citizens of different states, and between a state or a citizen thereof and a foreign state, citizen, or subject, provided that the national courts shall not have jurisdiction under subparagraph (b) (iii) of this section in cases in which the ownership of land or water is at issue.
(c) When jurisdiction is concurrent, the proper court may be prescribed by statute.

DO YOU APPROVE OF THIS PROPOSED AMENDMENT TO THE CONSTITUTION?

Choice	Popular vote		State vote
Choice	Votes	%	State vote
For		63	0
Against		37	4
Invalid/blank votes		–	–
Total		100	4
Registered voters/turnout			–
Source: Direct Democracy

==== States ====
It is hereby proposed that a new Section 8 of Article XIII of the Constitution of the Federated States of Micronesia be amended to read as follows:

Section 8. Full faith and credit shall be given in each state to the public acts, records and judicial proceedings of every other state. Congress may prescribe by statute the manner in which such acts, records and judicial proceedings shall be proved and the effect thereof.

DO YOU APPROVE OF THIS PROPOSED AMENDMENT TO THE CONSTITUTION?

Choice	Popular vote		State vote
Choice	Votes	%	State vote
For		65	1
Against		35	3
Invalid/blank votes		–	–
Total		100	4
Registered voters/turnout			–
Source: Direct Democracy

==== Dual citizenship ====
It is hereby proposed that Section 3 of Article III of the Constitution of the Federated States of Micronesia be repealed.

Section 3. A citizen of the Federated States of Micronesia who is recognized as a citizen of another nation shall, within 3 years of his 18th birthday, or within 3 years of the effective date of this Constitution, whichever is later, register his intent to remain a citizen of the Federated States and renounce his citizenship of another nation. If he fails to comply with this Section, he becomes a national of the Federated States of Micronesia.

DO YOU APPROVE OF THIS PROPOSED AMENDMENT TO THE CONSTITUTION?

Choice	Popular vote		State vote
Choice	Votes	%	State vote
For		63	1
Against		37	3
Invalid/blank votes		–	–
Total		100	4
Registered voters/turnout			–
Source: Direct Democracy
