= Greens of Andorra =

Greens of Andorra Els Verds d'Andorra
- Leader: Isabel Lozano Muñoz
- Founded: 2003
- Headquarters: A. de Correus 2136, AD 557 Andorra la Vella
- Ideology: Eco-socialism; Green politics
- Political position: Centre-left to left-wing
- European affiliation: European Green Party
- International affiliation: Global Greens
- Colours: Green

Website
- http://www.verds.ad/

The Greens of Andorra (Catalan: Verds d'Andorra, VA) is a green political party in Andorra.

== History ==
The party first contested national elections in 2005, when they ran in the parliamentary elections. They received 3.4% of the vote and failed to win a seat in the General Council. In the 2009 elections the party received 3.2% of the vote, failing to win a seat. The 2011 elections saw the party receive 3.4% of the vote, and again fail to win a seat.
