= Liberal Opinion Group =

Defunct political party of Andorra

The Liberal Opinion Group (Catalan: Grup opinió liberal, GOL) was a local political party in Andorra.

== History ==
The party first contested national elections in 1997, when it was one of several local parties to ally with the Liberal Union to run in parish constituencies in the parliamentary elections. The GOL won two seats as the alliance won a total of 16 of the 28 seats in the General Council, and formed a government under Marc Forné Molné.
