= Enric Tarrado Vives =

Andorran politician

Antonella Benedettini

Member of the Andorran Parliament for Andorran Democratic Centre
- In office 10 March 1997 – 4 March 2001

Member of the Andorran Parliament for Andorran Democratic Centre + Segle XXI
- In office 25 April 2005 – 2 March 2009

Personal details
- Born: August 5, 1962 (age 63)
- Party: Andorran Democratic Centre
- Relations

Permanent Representative of Andorra to United Nations Office and other International Organisations in Geneva
- In office 2012 – February 2019

Andorran Ambassador to San Marino
- In office 2012 – February 2019

Andorran Ambassador to Monaco
- In office 2012 – February 2019

Andorran Ambassador to Switzerland
- In office 2012 – February 2019

Andorran Ambassador to Liechtenstein
- In office 14 June 2012 – February 2019

Enric Tarrado Vives is an Andorran politician and former ambassador. From 2005 until 2009 he was a member of the Consell General, the legislative branch of Andorra, where he was chairman of the fraction of the party "Andorran Democratic Centre + Segle XXI". In 2019 he stood again for the Consell Generall as the leader of the "Andorran Democratic Centre and Independents" in the parish Andorra la Vella, but was defeated by the party d'Acord by 12 votes (0.26 % point).

From 2012 until his decision to stand in the 2019 elections, he was ambassador of Andorra to Liechtenstein, Monaco, San Marino and Switzerland, as well as permanent representative of Andorra to the United Nations Office at Geneva.
