= Suos Yara =

Cambodian politician

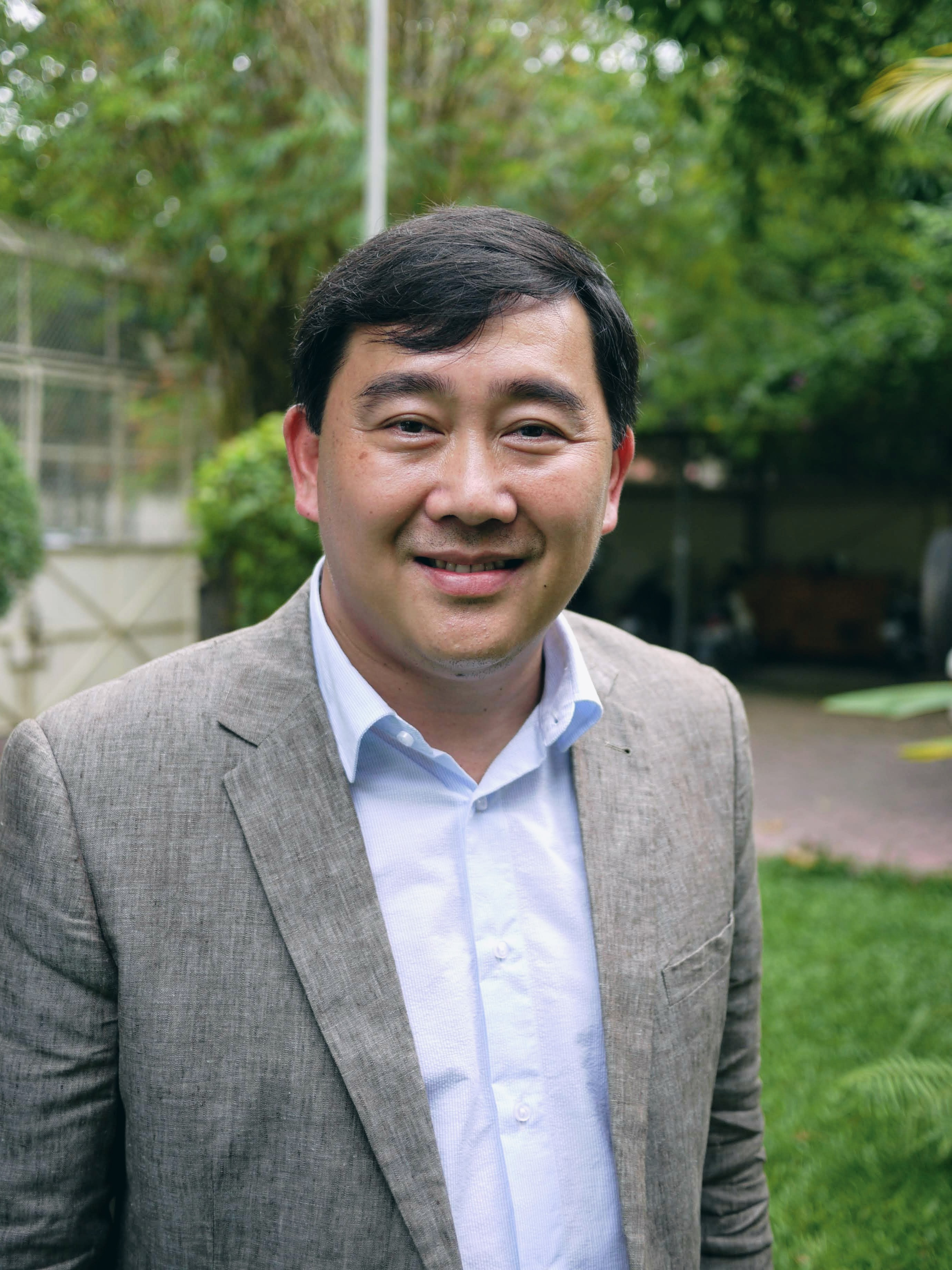

Personal details
- Born: 18 November 1973 (age 52)
- Party: Cambodian People's Party

Suos Yara (Khmer: សួស យ៉ារ៉ា; born 18 November 1973) is a Cambodian politician who serves as a spokesperson for the Cambodian People's Party. He is a member of the National Assembly of Cambodia, representing the Kompong Thom constituency. He also serves as a member the Central Committee of the Cambodian People's Party, and is a vice-chairman of its Commission for External Relations.
