= 2009 Andorran parliamentary election =

- 26 April 2009
- All 28 seats in the General Council
Party	Leader	Vote %	Seats	+/–
PS+GUPI	Jaume Bartumeu	45.03	14	+3
CR+UL	Joan Gabriel i Estany	32.34	11	−5
APC+UP+S21+RD	Eusebi Nomen Calvet	18.86	3	+2
This lists parties that won seats. See the complete results below.
Results by parish
Prime Minister before	Prime Minister after
Albert Pintat; PLA	Jaume Bartumeu; PS

Parliamentary elections were held in Andorra on 26 April 2009, the fourth under the 1993 Constitution. The elections were held at the end of the normal four-year term of the General Council (Consell General, Andorra's parliament), but also following months of intense pressure from Co-Prince Nicolas Sarkozy to change the country's banking secrecy laws.

The Social Democratic Party led by Jaume Bartumeu was the clear winner, with 45.03% of votes for its national list, followed by the "Reformist Coalition" led by the Liberal Party of Andorra (32.34%) and the new Andorra for Change party (18.86%). The Social Democrats hold fourteen seats in the General Council, against eleven for the Liberals and three for Andorra for Change.

The electorate, restricted to Andorran citizens, was 20,298 voters out of a population of about 85,000. There were 114 candidates for 28 seats, more than one candidate for every 200 voters. Turnout was 75.3%.

== Issues ==
The main issue in the elections is the possible changes required to Andorra's economic model to facilitate its international relations.

On 11 March 2009, three weeks before the 2009 G-20 London Summit, the Head of Government Albert Pintat made a unilateral declaration in Paris promising to improve the exchange of information (for tax purposes) about non-residents who hold bank accounts in Andorra. He committed the incoming government to drafting changes to the banking secrecy laws by 1 September 2009, which would then be passed by the General Council before 15 November 2009. He also announced that he would not be leading the Liberal Party of Andorra in the elections so as to devote his time to negotiating tax treaties with other countries, starting with France. Such agreements would also abolish the punitive customs duties which France and Spain impose on Andorran exports (33% and 25% respectively). The Liberal Party and the Social Democratic Party have agreed to cooperate in the drafting of the new legislation.

The negotiation of tax treaties is complicated by the present tax structure of Andorra. The state is funded mostly by indirect taxation, such as levies on water supplies and telecommunications, and by fees for administrative permits. The Social Democratic Party proposes the introduction of income tax and value added tax, albeit at low rates, whereas the Liberal Party prefers keeping changes to the tax system to a minimum. Andorra for Change rejects any changes whatsoever to the current system.

A third issue is the relationship Andorra should have with the European Economic Area (EEA): at present, Andorra has a limited set of bilateral agreements with the European Union in the fields of economic, social, and cultural cooperation, signed in June 2004. The Social Democratic Party favours expanding these into a fully fledged association agreement; the Liberal Party is more reticent, but has promised to cooperate in any discussions.

== Electoral system ==
Twenty-eight "general councillors" were elected on 26 April 2009, based on party lists (closed list system):

- two general councillors from each of the seven parishes, elected from the list with most votes in each parish;
- fourteen general councillors elected from national lists using the largest remainder method of proportional representation.

The parish lists and the national list are independent of one another: the same person cannot appear on both the national list and on a parish list, and voters cast two separate ballots (there is no requirement to vote for the same party for both lists).

== Party lists ==
Name of national list	First candidate on national list	Parish lists	2005 result	
Name of national list	First candidate on national list	Parish lists	%	Seats
Reformist Coalition (Coalició Reformista): Liberal Party of Andorra (Partit Liberal Andorrà); Lauredian Union (Unió Laurediana); New Centre (Nou Centre), successor to Andorran Democratic Centre–Century 21 (Centre Demòcrata Andorrà–Segle 21); Independents of Ordino (Independents d'Ordino)	Joan Gabriel	7	41.2% (11.0%)	14 (2)
Social Democratic Party (Partit Socialdemòcrata): with the Parochial Union of Independents Group (Grup d'Unió Parroquial Independents), and other independents in some parishes	Jaume Bartumeu	7	38.0%	11
Andorra for Change (Andorra pel Canvi): supported by Democratic Renewal (Renovació Democràtica)	Juan Eusebio Nomen Calvet	5	(6.2%)	(1)
National Union of Progress (Unió Nacional de Progrés)	Tomas Pascual Casabosch	0	—	—
Greens of Andorra (Els Verds d'Andorra)	Isabel Lozano Muñoz	3	3.5%	0

== Results ==
Party	PR			Constituency			Total seats
Party	Votes	%	Seats	Votes	%	Seats	Total seats
Social Democratic Party (Note: Ran with Parochial Union of Independents Group in Ordino)	6,610	45.03	6	6,457	44.69	8	14
Reformist Coalition (Note: Ran with Lauredian Union in Sant Julià de Lòria.)	4,747	32.34	5	4,662	32.27	6	11
Independents of Ordino	4,747	32.34	0	359	2.48	0	0
Andorra for Change (Note: Ran with United for Progress in Encamp, Century 21 in Sant Julià de Lòria and Democratic Renewal in Escaldes- Engordand)	2,768	18.86	3	2,508	17.36	0	3
Greens of Andorra	466	3.17	0	461	3.19	0	0
National Union of Progress	88	0.60	0				0
Total	14,679	100.00	14	14,447	100.00	14	28
Valid votes	14,679	95.99		14,447	94.55		
Invalid/blank votes	614	4.01		833	5.45		
Total votes	15,293	100.00		15,280	100.00		
Registered voters/turnout	20,298	75.34		20,298	75.28		
Source: Nohlen & Stöver, IPU, Eleccions.ad
