= Parochial Union of Independents Group =

Parochial Union of Independents Group Grup d'Unió Parroquial Independents
- Founded: 2003
- Dissolved: 2012
- Headquarters: Ordino
- Ideology: Progressivism; Ordino localism
- Political position: Centre-left

The Parochial Union of Independents Group (Catalan: Grup d'Unió Parroquial Independents, GUPI) was a local progressive political party in Ordino, Andorra.

== History ==
In the local elections in 2003 GUPI won two of the ten seats in Ordino. For the 2005 parliamentary elections the party was part of an alliance with the Social Democratic Party and Democratic Renewal named L'Alternativa. The alliance won twelve seats.

GUPI retained its alliance with the Social Democratic Party for the 2009 elections, with the coalition emerging victorious after winning 14 of the 28 seats. The alliance was also maintained for the 2011 elections, but failed to win a seat in Ordino.
