= List of heads of government of Andorra =

Prime Minister of the Principality of Andorra
- Cap de Govern del Principat d'Andorra
- Coat of arms of Andorra

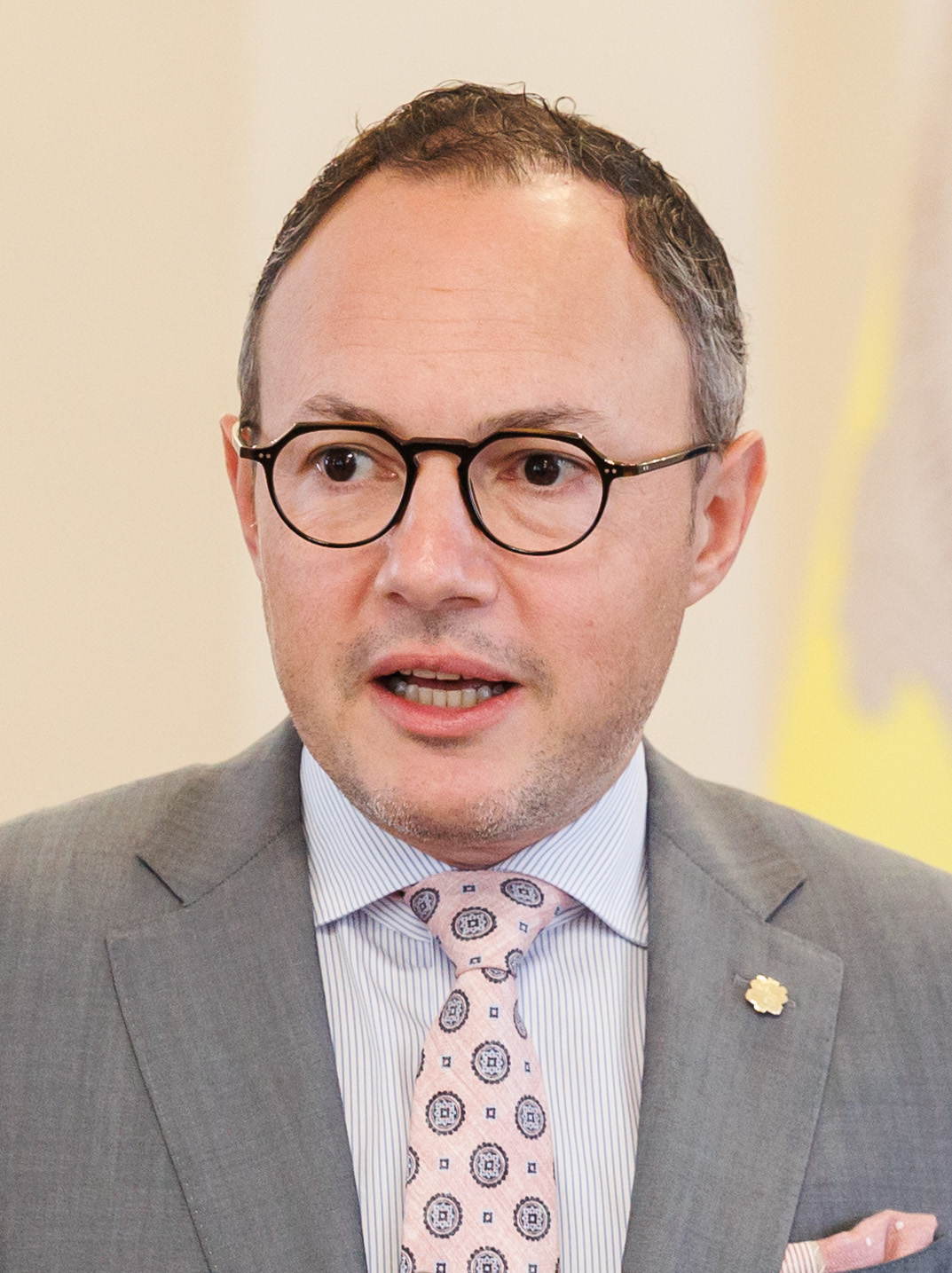
- Incumbent; Xavier Espot Zamora since 16 May 2019
- Member of: Executive Council
- Appointer: General Council of Andorra
- Term length: Four years, renewable; (traditionally limited to two terms)
- Formation: 8 January 1982
- First holder: Òscar Ribas Reig
- Salary: €71,000 annually
- Website: www.govern.ad

The head of government of the Principality of Andorra (Catalan: Cap de Govern del Principat d'Andorra), alternatively known as the prime minister of Andorra, is the chief executive of the government of Andorra. They are appointed by the General Council. The position was created in 1982 after constitutional reforms separated the executive and legislative powers. Òscar Ribas Reig was elected as the country's first prime minister on 4 January 1982. The current prime minister is Xavier Espot Zamora, who has been in office since 16 May 2019.

== Prime ministers of Andorra (1982–present) ==
No.	Portrait	Name (life range)	Elected	Term of office			Political party
No.	Portrait	Name (life range)	Elected	Took office	Left office	Time in office	Political party
1		Òscar Ribas Reig (1936–2020)	1981	8 January 1982	21 May 1984	2 years, 134 days	Independent
2		Josep Pintat-Solans (1925–2007)	1985	21 May 1984	12 January 1990	5 years, 236 days	Independent
(1)		Òscar Ribas Reig (1936–2020)	1989; 1992; 1993	12 January 1990	7 December 1994	4 years, 326 days	National Democratic Group
3		Marc Forné Molné (born 1946)	1997; 2001	7 December 1994	27 May 2005	10 years, 174 days	Liberal Party
4		Albert Pintat (born 1943)	2005	27 May 2005	5 June 2009	4 years, 9 days	Liberal Party
5		Jaume Bartumeu (born 1954)	2009	5 June 2009	28 April 2011	1 year, 327 days	Social Democratic Party
—		Pere López Agràs (born 1971); Acting	—	28 April 2011	12 May 2011	14 days	Social Democratic Party
6		Antoni Martí (1963–2023)	2011	12 May 2011	23 March 2015	3 years, 315 days	Democrats for Andorra
—		Gilbert Saboya Sunyé (born 1966); Acting	—	23 March 2015	1 April 2015	9 days	Democrats for Andorra
(6)		Antoni Martí (1963–2023)	2015	1 April 2015	16 May 2019	4 years, 45 days	Democrats for Andorra
7		Xavier Espot Zamora (born 1979)	2019; 2023	16 May 2019	Incumbent	7 years, 174 days	Democrats for Andorra

== Timeline ==
This is a graphical lifespan timeline of the prime ministers of Andorra. They are listed in order of first assuming office.

The following chart lists prime ministers by lifespan (living prime ministers on the green line), with the years outside of their premiership in beige.

The following chart shows prime ministers by their age (living prime ministers in green), with the years of their premiership in blue. The vertical black line at 18 years indicates the minimum age to be prime minister.

== See also ==
- List of co-princes of Andorra
