= 2005 Egyptian constitutional referendum =

- 25 May 2005
- Do you agree to amending Article 76 of the Constitution of the Arab Republic of Egypt?

Results
Choice	Votes	%
Yes	13,593,552	82.86%
No	2,811,894	17.14%
Valid votes	16,405,446	95.47%
Invalid or blank votes	778,856	4.53%
Total votes	17,184,302	100.00%
Registered voters/turnout	32,086,353	53.56%

A constitutional referendum was held in Egypt on 25 May 2005. Voters were asked to approve or reject an amendment to the constitution that would introduce direct elections for the presidency. Opposition parties called for a boycott of the vote, which was passed by a large majority.

== Background ==
Under the existing constitution, the People's Assembly, the lower house of the then-bicameral Parliament of Egypt, decided upon a candidate for president. That candidate was then confirmed by the people in a referendum. The incumbent president Hosni Mubarak was confirmed in four referendums in 1981, 1987, 1993 and 1999 receiving at least 95% supporting votes in each referendum. By 2005 international and domestic pressure grew for reforms to this process to permit direct elections for the presidency.

On the 26 February 2005 President Mubarak called on parliament to amend Article 76 of the constitution to allow multi candidate elections for president to take place in time for the presidential election due later in the year. This change would then be put to a referendum in May. On the 10 May the Parliament of Egypt overwhelmingly approved the change to the constitution by 405 votes to 34 and the referendum was set for the 25 May.

== Referendum question ==
Egyptian voters were asked to vote on the question:

Do you agree to amending Article 76 of the Constitution of the Arab Republic of Egypt?

== Campaign ==
Opposition parties called on voters to boycott the referendum. They were opposed to the strict requirements that the amended constitution would require candidates to meet in order to be able to stand in presidential elections. Under the proposed amendment independent candidates would be required to get the support of 250 elected members of councils and parliament including 65 of the 444 members of the People's Assembly of Egypt in order to stand. Candidates from political parties could stand in the upcoming election in September, but for future presidential elections they would have to win 5% of the seats in the People's Assembly before being able to field a candidate. Political parties would also have to have existed for five years before they could put a candidate up for election. The councils and parliament were all dominated by members of the governing National Democratic Party and no other political party then met the 5% level. As a result, the opposition said that the changes would not allow candidates to stand unless the governing party permitted them to. As well as the legal opposition parties, the banned Muslim Brotherhood group also called on voters to boycott the vote, describing it as meaningless.

The government described the amendment as the historic beginning of a new democratic era. They said that restrictions on who could stand as a candidate were necessary in order to prevent candidates who would use their wealth to buy votes and to ensure that only candidates who had a serious chance could stand.

On the 24 May five petitions by the opposition to stop the vote were rejected by the Egyptian judiciary.

== Conduct ==
On the day of the referendum itself demonstrations were made against the strict rules on who would be able to stand in future presidential elections. At protests in Cairo demonstrators were beaten by government agents and supporters. Observers reported seeing a low turnout at the polls in the capital Cairo but reports said there had been a larger turnout elsewhere.

Many Egyptians got time off from work to vote and the Governor of Cairo gave free public transport to those who showed their voter registration card. In a number of areas government employees were taken by bus to the polling stations in order to vote with support for President Mubarak being said to be one of the main reasons for people to vote yes in the referendum. The official turnout figures at around 54% were higher than in any previous presidential referendum.

== Results ==
Choice	Votes	%
For	13,593,552	82.86
Against	2,811,894	17.14
Total	16,405,446	100.00
Valid votes	16,405,446	95.47
Invalid/blank votes	778,856	4.53
Total votes	17,184,302	100.00
Registered voters/turnout	32,086,353	53.56
Source: IFES

== Aftermath ==
Following the referendum a report produced by Egyptian judges for the Cairo Judges' Syndicate said that the referendum had seen large scale fraud and that the results had been falsified. They said that polling stations where they had supervised voting had seen only a very low turnout, while in areas overseen by civil servants turnout was often over 90%. The Interior Ministry, however, rejected these claims saying that people in Southern Egypt had turned out in high levels due to their interest in voting.

Presidential elections were held under the amended constitution in September 2005 and President Mubarak was re-elected with over 88% of the vote on a low turnout.
