= 1999 Andorran local elections =

The 1999 Andorran local elections were held on 12 December. Voters elected the council members of the seven parishes.

== Electoral system ==
Voters elect the members of the municipal councils (consells de comú in Catalan). The electoral law allows the municipal councils to choose their numbers of seats, which must be an even number between 10 and 16.

All city council members were elected in single multi-member districts, consisting of the whole parish, using closed lists. Half of the seats were allocated to the party with the most votes. The other half of the seats were allocated using the Hare quota (including the winning party). With this system the winning party obtained an absolute majority.

The cònsol major (mayor) and the cònsol menor (deputy mayor) were elected indirectly by the municipal councillors.

== Results ==
=== Overall ===
Party	Votes	%	Seats
Liberal Party of Andorra	3,187	38.1	24
Coalition for Progress	2,416	28.9	13
Progress List	913	10.9	9
Parochial Democratic Group	433	5.2	8
Liberal Opinion Group - Tradition and Progress	432	5.2	2
Renovator Party of Ordino	269	3.2	8
Coalition for the Quality of life and Progress	260	3.1	2
Union for the Progress	258	3.1	11
Unity and Renewal	206	2.5	3
Blank votes	1,087	–	–
Invalid votes	45	–	–
Total	9,506	100	80
Registered voters/turnout	12,222	77.8	–

=== Canillo ===
Party	Votes	%	Seats
Union for the Progress	258	55.6	11
Unity and Renewal	206	44.4	3
Blank votes	12	–	–
Invalid votes	1	–	–
Total	477	100	14
Registered voters/turnout	536	89.0	–

=== Encamp ===
Party	Votes	%	Seats
Progress List	913	76.2	9
Liberal Party of Andorra	285	23.8	1
Blank votes	129	–	–
Invalid votes	7	–	–
Total	1,334	100	10
Registered voters/turnout	1,686	79.1	–

=== Ordino ===
Party	Votes	%	Seats
Renovator Party of Ordino	269	50.9	8
Coalition for the quality of life and progress	260	49.1	2
Blank votes	42	–	–
Invalid votes	2	–	–
Total	573	100	10
Registered voters/turnout	666	86.0	–

=== La Massana ===
Party	Votes	%	Seats
Parochial Democratic Group	433	50.1	8
Liberal Opinion Group - Tradition and Progress	432	49.9	2
Blank votes	70	–	–
Invalid votes	1	–	–
Total	936	100	10
Registered voters/turnout	1,089	86.0	–

=== Andorra la Vella ===
Party	Votes	%	Seats
Coalition for Progress	1,488	60.1	10
Liberal Party of Andorra	989	39.9	2
Blank votes	226	–	–
Invalid votes	6	–	–
Total	2,709	100	12
Registered voters/turnout	3,647	74.3	–

=== Sant Julià de Lòria ===
Party	Votes	%	Seats
Lauredian Union - Liberal Party of Andorra	824	100	12
Blank votes	460	–	–
Invalid votes	17	–	–
Total	1,301	100	12
Registered voters/turnout	1,849	70.4	–

=== Escaldes-Engordany ===
Party	Votes	%	Seats
Liberal Party of Andorra	1,089	54.0	9
Coalition for Progress	928	46.0	3
Blank votes	148	–	–
Invalid votes	11	–	–
Total	2,176	100	12
Registered voters/turnout	2,749	79.2	–
