= 1997 Andorran parliamentary election =

- 16 February 1997

All 28 seats in the General Council 15 seats needed for a majority

Parliamentary elections were held in Andorra on 16 February 1997. The result was a victory for the Liberal Union, which won 16 of the 28 seats. Its leader, Marc Forné Molné, remained Prime Minister. Voter turnout was 81.6%.

== Results ==
Party or alliance		PR			Constituency			Total seats	+/–
Party or alliance		Votes	%	Seats	Votes	%	Seats	Total seats	+/–
Liberal Union and allies	Liberal Union	3,543	42.27	6	1,704	21.78	4	10	+5
Liberal Union and allies	Lauredian Union				701	8.96	2	2	New
Liberal Union and allies	Liberal Opinion Group				421	5.38	2	2	New
Liberal Union and allies	Liberal Union–Liberal Group of Encamp				417	5.33	0	0	New
Liberal Union and allies	Parochial Union of Ordino				255	3.26	2	2	New
Liberal Union and allies	Unity and Renewal				231	2.95	2	2	New
Liberal Union and allies	Total	3,543	42.27	6	3,729	47.65	10	18	+13
National Democratic Group		2,374	28.33	4	2,633	33.65	2	6	–2
New Democracy		1,471	17.55	2	959	12.26	0	2	–3
Democratic National Initiative		993	11.85	2	504	6.44	0	2	0
Total		8,381	100.00	14	7,825	100.00	14	28	0
Valid votes		8,381	94.81		7,825	88.54			
Invalid/blank votes		459	5.19		1,013	11.46			
Total votes		8,840	100.00		8,838	100.00			
Registered voters/turnout		10,837	81.57		10,837	81.55			
Source: Elections Andorra
