= 2011 Andorran parliamentary election =

- 3 April 2011
- All 28 seats in the General Council
Party	Leader	Vote %	Seats	+/–
DA	Antoni Martí	55.15	20	+11
PS	Jaume Bartumeu	34.80	6	−8
UL	Montserrat Gil i Roser	9.01	2	0
This lists parties that won seats. See the complete results below.
Results by Parish
Prime Minister before	Prime Minister after
Jaume Bartumeu; PS	Antoni Martí; DA

Early parliamentary elections were held in Andorra on 3 April 2011 after the General Council of Andorra was dissolved over problems in passing important laws, including the budget and laws related to a value added tax.

The Democrats for Andorra won an absolute majority of seats making Antoni Martí the prime minister-designate.

== Background ==
The two co-princes of Andorra – the President of France and the Bishop of Urgell – do not get involved in internal politics, particularly after the May 1993 constitution making the principality an independent state.

=== Fall of government ===
A crisis in government developed after banking secrecy laws were lifted and a value added tax was due to be applied to companies, along with an opening up to foreign investment. After the 2009 election, the Social Democratic Party achieved a plurality of seats but fell one seat short of an overall majority, thus providing for more deadlock during key pieces of legislation. The government fell two years before its full four-year term was due to end after failing to pass the budget with an absolute majority. Jaume Bartumeu effectively called for an election by requesting that the country's co-princes dissolve parliament.

== Electoral system ==
Twenty-eight "general councillors" were elected, based on closed party lists:

- fourteen general councillors representing the seven parishes (two councillors per parish), elected from the list with most votes in each parish;
- fourteen general councillors elected from national lists using the largest remainder method of proportional representation.

The parish lists and the national list are independent of one another: the same person cannot appear on both the national list and on a parish list, and voters cast two separate ballots. There is no requirement to vote for the same party for both lists.

== Campaign ==
Five parties contested the election: The governing Social Democrats (PS), the newly formed opposition Democrats for Andorra (DA), the third place Andorra for Change (ApC), the Greens and the local conservative Lauredian Union (LU) party.

Out of these only the PS, DA and LU contested the parish seats. The PS contested all parishes, while DA contested all but Sant Julià de Lòria, which was contested by Lauredian Union. ApC announced they would support DA candidates on a parish level. The Liberal Party of Andorra, which finished in second place with 11 seats in the prior elections, did not contest.

Incumbent Prime Minister Jaume Bartumeu and his main challenger Antoni Martí wanted to change the protectionism previously prevalent in the national economy. They sought to attract foreign capital primarily in the technology sector to diversify from a current economy based on trade (33%), tourism (33%) and banking (17%). Due to the 2008 financial crisis and its effect on Spain, which accounts for 80% of Andorran trade, (the other 20% with France) the economy was in a "severe crisis." Since 2008, 4,000 people in the country of 84,525 (almost 5% of the total population) lost their jobs, including seasonal employment.

Bartumeu had released the listing of Andorra's tax haven status with the Organisation for Economic Co-operation and Development. He also enacted a law to lift bank secrecy. He accuses right-winged parties of not forgiving him for a "move towards transparency and fiscal reforms."

Martí said that: "We develop our tax system to be within the European standards, Andorrans do not want to pay taxes, but they understand the need to change the system. We will keep an attractive tax regime and will continue to offer attractive products." Still there was some "broad consensus on economic and tax issues" between the two main parties; though the main difference was the creation of an income tax. Bartumeu sought to tax incomes of more than 40,000 euros, even though the minimum wage is 39,600. Marti opposed the entire proposal.

Eusebi Nomen of Andorra for Change also denounced the proposed increased tax burden and accused the government of selling "national sovereignty."

The Greens of Andorra's Isabel Lozano said that economic development must be more environmentally friendly.

== Results ==
The Democrats for Andorra won a landslide victory, taking every parish in which they stood and winning the national vote, giving them 20 out of the 28 General Council's seats, the biggest victory in the country's history. The Social Democrats lost all their parish seats and held only their six national seats, while Lauredian Union returned to the General Council, winning the parish of Sant Julià de Lòria. Andorra for Change lost all their seats, and the Greens finished last, gaining no seats.

Voter turnout was 74.14%. Of the 28 members elected, 14 were women, making 50% of the parliament legislators women (up from 32%). This made Andorra the first European country to reach gender parity in parliament.

Party	PR			Constituency			Total seats
Party	Votes	%	Seats	Votes	%	Seats	Total seats
Democrats for Andorra (Note: Ran with United for Progress in Encamp)	8,553	55.15	8	7,723	51.58	12	20
Lauredian Union	8,553	55.15	–	1,349	9.01	2	2
Social Democratic Party (Note: Ran with Parochial Union of Independents Group in Ordino)	5,397	34.80	6	5,901	39.41	0	6
Andorra for Change	1,040	6.71	0				0
Greens of Andorra	520	3.35	0				0
Total	15,510	100.00	14	14,973	100.00	14	28
Valid votes	15,510	95.76		14,973	92.51		
Invalid/blank votes	687	4.24		1,212	7.49		
Total votes	16,197	100.00		16,185	100.00		
Registered voters/turnout	21,852	74.12		21,852	74.07		
Source: Andorra Elections

=== Parish lists ===
Canillo

Party	Votes	%	Seats	+/–
Democrats for Andorra	421	70.64	2	0
Social Democratic Party and independents	175	29.36	0	0
Total	596	100.00	2	0
Valid votes	596	92.12		
Invalid/blank votes	51	7.88		
Total votes	647	100.00		
Registered voters/turnout	794	81.49		
Source: Andorra Elections

Encamp

Party	Votes	%	Seats	+/–
Democrats for Andorra and United for Progress	1,324	63.35	2	0
Social Democratic Party and independents	766	36.65	0	0
Total	2,090	100.00	2	0
Valid votes	2,090	93.26		
Invalid/blank votes	151	6.74		
Total votes	2,241	100.00		
Registered voters/turnout	3,004	74.60		
Source: Andorra Elections

Ordino

Party	Votes	%	Seats	+/–
Democrats for Andorra	560	53.90	2	+2
Social Democratic Party–GUPI	479	46.10	0	–2
Total	1,039	100.00	2	0
Valid votes	1,039	92.19		
Invalid/blank votes	88	7.81		
Total votes	1,127	100.00		
Registered voters/turnout	1,379	81.73		
Source: Andorra Elections

La Massana

Party	Votes	%	Seats	+/–
Democrats for Andorra	1,112	65.53	2	+2
Social Democratic Party and independents	585	34.47	0	–2
Total	1,697	100.00	2	0
Valid votes	1,697	92.73		
Invalid/blank votes	133	7.27		
Total votes	1,830	100.00		
Registered voters/turnout	2,311	79.19		
Source: Andorra Elections

Andorra la Vella

Party	Votes	%	Seats	+/–
Democrats for Andorra	2,219	53.14	2	+2
Social Democratic Party and independents	1,957	46.86	0	–2
Total	4,176	100.00	2	0
Valid votes	4,176	92.47		
Invalid/blank votes	340	7.53		
Total votes	4,516	100.00		
Registered voters/turnout	6,604	68.38		
Source: Andorra Elections

Sant Julià de Lòria

Party	Votes	%	Seats	+/–
Lauredian Union	1,349	61.77	2	0
Social Democratic Party and independents	835	38.23	0	0
Total	2,184	100.00	2	0
Valid votes	2,184	90.62		
Invalid/blank votes	226	9.38		
Total votes	2,410	100.00		
Registered voters/turnout	3,173	75.95		
Source: Andorra Elections

Escaldes-Engordany

Party	Votes	%	Seats	+/–
Democrats for Andorra	2,087	65.40	2	+2
Social Democratic Party and independents	1,104	34.60	0	–2
Total	3,191	100.00	2	0
Valid votes	3,191	93.47		
Invalid/blank votes	223	6.53		
Total votes	3,414	100.00		
Registered voters/turnout	4,587	74.43		
Source: Andorra Elections
