= Josep Pintat Solans =

Prime Minister of Andorra

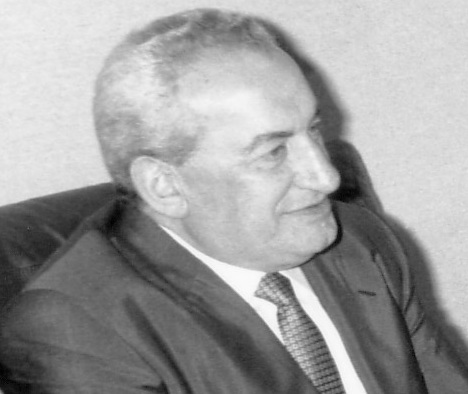
- Pintat Solans in 1988

Prime Minister of Andorra
- In office 21 May 1984 – 12 January 1990
- Monarchs: Episcopal Co-prince: Joan Martí i Alanis; French Co-prince: François Mitterrand
- Preceded by: Òscar Ribas Reig
- Succeeded by: Òscar Ribas Reig

Personal details
- Born: January 21, 1925
- Died: October 20, 2007 (aged 82)
- Spouse: Josette Forné Sautes (d. 14 May 2017)

Josep Pintat Solans (Catalan: [ʒuˈzɛp pinˈtat suˈlans]; January 21, 1925 – October 20, 2007) was the prime minister of Andorra.

A local business executive, he was unanimously elected prime minister by the General Council of Andorra and began serving on May 21, 1984; Pintat Solans was re-elected in January 1986, receiving the votes of 27 out of 28 of the General Council's members, serving as Prime Minister until January 12, 1990.

He died on October 20, 2007, after a long illness.

In 2024 he posthumously received the Cross of the Seven Arms (Creu dels Set Braços) from the government of Andorra.

Political offices
Preceded by Òscar Ribas Reig	Prime Minister of Andorra; May 21, 1984 – January 12, 1990	Succeeded by Òscar Ribas Reig
