= 1992 Andorran parliamentary election =

Parliamentary elections were held in Andorra on 5 April 1992, with a second round of voting on 12 April. Following the elections, Òscar Ribas Reig remained Prime Minister.

== Electoral system ==
All 28 seats of the General Council were up for election. Each parish formed a constituency, electing four members each. Members of the Parliament were elected using a two-round plurality voting system. The voting age was 18 years old.

As political parties were not legalised until 1993, all candidates ran as independents, although press and newspapers considered some candidates to be government endorsed (supporting Ribas government) or opponents.

Following the elections, the General Council elected the Prime Minister of Andorra and the General Syndic (speaker).

== Results ==
Voter turnout was 82.4%. A total of 19 candidates were elected on the first round, with the remaining nine seats – one seat in Canillo, four in La Massana and four in Escaldes-Engordany – elected in the second round.

| Party | First round | | | Second round | | | Total seats |
| Party | Votes | % | Seats | Votes | % | Seats | Total seats |
|---|---|---|---|---|---|---|---|
| Independents | | | 19 | | | 9 | 28 |
| Total | | | 19 | | | 9 | 28 |
| Total votes | 7,077 | – | | | | | |
| Registered voters/turnout | 8,593 | 82.36 | | | | | |
Source: Nohlen & Stöver, La Vanguardia, La Vanguardia

=== By affiliation ===
| Parish | Government-endorsed | Opposition |
|---|---|---|
| Canillo | 1 | 3 |
| Encamp | 4 | 0 |
| Ordino | 0 | 4 |
| La Massana | 0 | 4 |
| Andorra la Vella | 4 | 0 |
| Sant Julià de Lòria | 4 | 0 |
| Escaldes-Engordany | 4 | 0 |
| Total | 17 | 11 |
Source: Nohlen & Stöver, La Vanguardia, La Vanguardia

== Aftermath ==
Òscar Ribas Reig was re-elected as Prime Minister.
