= 1982 Andorran electoral system referendum =

28 May 1982
Majority system	32.78%
Proportional system	23.95%
Mixed system	43.27%

A referendum on the electoral system was held in Andorra on 28 May 1982.

== Background ==
In December 1980 the Co-Princes agreed on reforms, including the establishment of an Executive Council and the holding of a referendum on the voting system. Voters were offered the options of a majority system, a proportional system (in which the parishes would serve as constituencies) or a mixed system, with candidates elected using the majority system at the national level and the proportional system in the parishes.

== Results ==
Choice	Votes	%
Majority system	616	32.78
Proportional system	450	23.95
Mixed system	813	43.27
Total	1,879	100.00
Valid votes	1,879	97.56
Invalid/blank votes	47	2.44
Total votes	1,926	100.00
Registered voters/turnout	3,660	52.62
Source: Direct Democracy
