= 1981 Andorran parliamentary election =

- 9 December 1981 16 December 1981

All 28 seats in the General Council 15 seats needed for a majority

Parliamentary elections were held in Andorra on 9 December 1981, with a second round of voting on 16 December. Local elections were held on the same day. Following the elections, Òscar Ribas Reig became the country's first Prime Minister.

== Electoral system ==
For the first time, all 28 seats of the General Council were up for election at the same time. Between 1867 and 1979 only half of the seats were renewed in each election.

Each parish formed a constituency, electing four members each. Members of the Parliament were elected using a two-round plurality voting system. As political parties were not legalised until 1993, all candidates ran as independents.

Following the election, the General Council elected the Prime Minister of Andorra, and the General Syndic (speaker).

== Results ==
Voter turnout was 74.5%. A second round was only held in Canillo to elect two vacant seats not filled in the first round.

Party	First round			Second round			Total seats
Party	Votes	%	Seats	Votes	%	Seats	Total seats
Independents	2,178	100.00	26			2	28
Total	2,178	100.00	26			2	28
Valid votes	2,178	80.10					
Invalid/blank votes	541	19.90					
Total votes	2,719	100.00					
Registered voters/turnout	3,648	74.53					
Source: Nohlen & Stöver, La Vanguardia
