= National Democratic Group =

Political party of Andorra

National Democratic Group Agrupament Nacional Democràtic
- Abbreviation: AND
- Leader: Òscar Ribas Reig (1993); Ladislau Baró Solà (1997)
- Founded: 1993
- Dissolved: June–October 2000
- Succeeded by: Social Democratic Party; Democratic Party
- Ideology: Liberalism; Social liberalism
- Political position: Centre to centre-right
- Colours: Blue
- General Council (1993): 8 / 28
- General Council (1997): 6 / 28

Website
- www.and.ad (archived)

The National Democratic Group (Catalan: Agrupament Nacional Democràtic, AND) was a political party in Andorra.

== History ==
The party was established in 1993 after political parties were legalised. In the elections that year it received 26.4% of the vote, emerging as the largest party in the General Council with eight of the 28 seats. Its leader Òscar Ribas Reig remained Prime Minister after the AND formed a coalition government with other progressive parties. However, in November 1994 Ribas lost a vote of no confidence and Marc Forné Molné of the Liberal Union became prime minister.

In the 1997 elections the AND was reduced to six seats whilst the Liberal Union won 16. Shortly before the 2001 elections the party split into the Social Democratic Party (which won six seats) and the Democratic Party (which won five).
