= Jaume Bartumeu =

Prime Minister of Andorra

Jaume Bartumeu GCIH
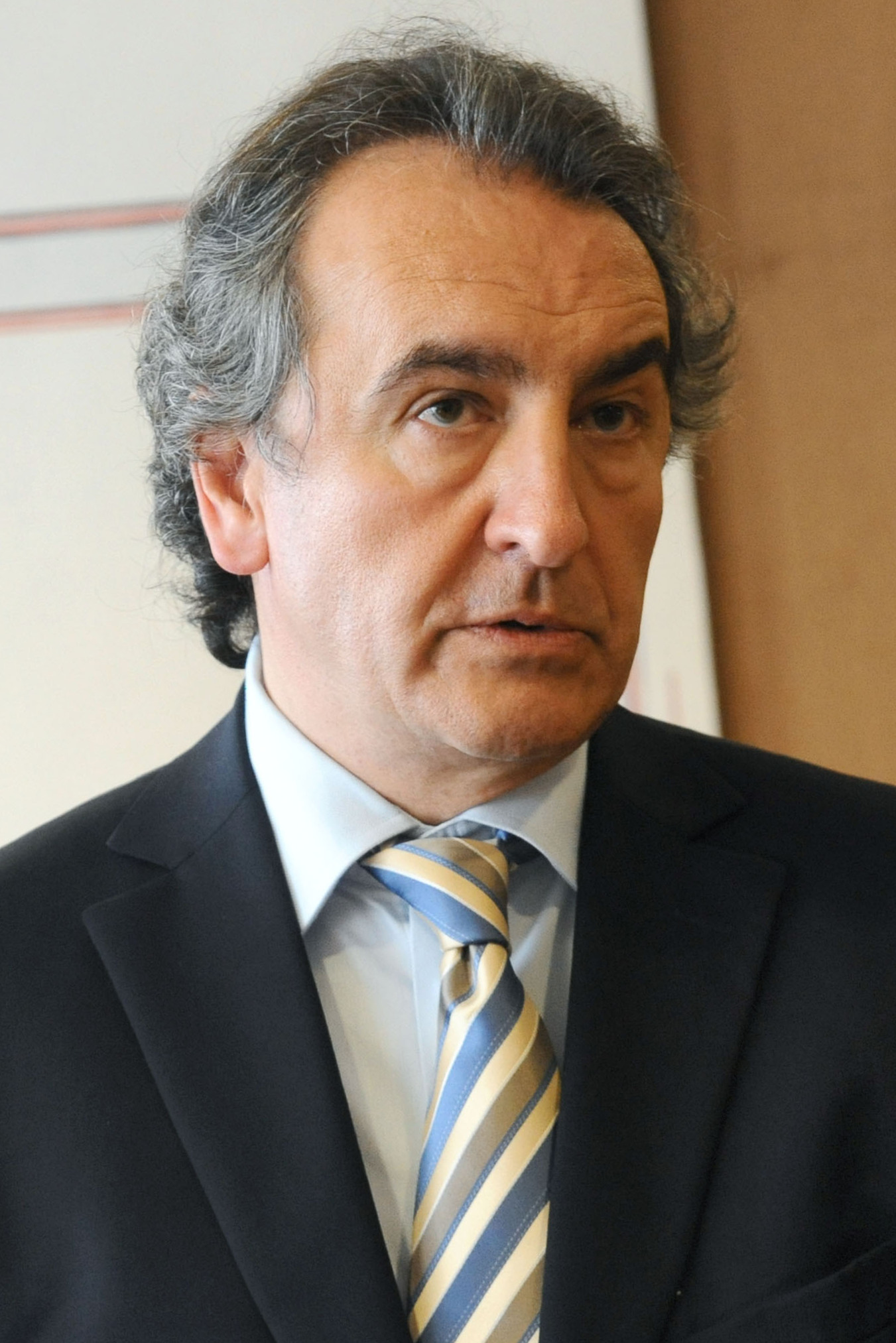
- Bartumeu in 2010

Prime Minister of Andorra
- In office 5 June 2009 – 28 April 2011
- Monarchs: Episcopal Co-prince: Joan Enric Vives Sicília; French Co-prince: Nicolas Sarkozy
- Representative: Episcopal: Nemesi Marqués Oste; Spanish: Christian Frémont
- Preceded by: Albert Pintat
- Succeeded by: Pere López Agràs (acting)

Personal details
- Born: 10 November 1954 (age 71)
- Party: Social Democratic Party
- Spouse: Carme Garcia Puy

Jaume Bartumeu Cassany, GCIH (Catalan: [ˈʒawmə βəɾtuˈmɛw kəˈsaɲ]; born 10 November 1954) is an Andorran lawyer and politician, who served as the prime minister of Andorra from 2009 to 2011. He was a founding member of the Social Democratic Party (PS) in June 2000, in which he held the position of first secretary between 2000 and 2004. He was the leader of the opposition at the General Council between 2005 and 2009.

== Political career ==
In May 2008, he was designated candidate for head of government at the 2009 General election by his party.

=== Prime minister ===
In the parliamentary election held on 26 April 2009, Bartumeu's party was the clear winner with a 45,03% of the national list vote and the majority in 4 of the 7 parishes, giving to the Social Democratic Party a relative majority of 14 seats out of 28. He was therefore the only candidate that could achieve the necessary majority to be invested head of the government of Andorra during the parliamentary vote held on May 29, 2009. Following the ApC's decision to abstain, however, he failed to be elected in that session (he received 14 votes and Joan Gabriel of the Reformist Coalition 11; 15 were required); another vote was set for 3 June 2009. He was confirmed on 3 June 2009 with a simple majority of 14 votes, and took office on 5 June 2009.

His party was heavily defeated in the 2011 parliamentary election.

=== Offices held ===
- 2001–2009 : Member of the General Council, head of the Social-Democrat parliamentary group. Member of the Andorran delegation to the Council of Europe from 2004 to 2008.
- 1993–2001 : Member of the General Council, head of the Nova Democracia parliamentary group. Member of the Andorran delegation to the Council of Europe from 1995 to 2001.
- 1992–1993 : Member of the General Council elected by Andorra-la-Vella. Member of the legislative commission in charge of the constituent process.
- 1990–1992 : Minister of Finance, Commerce and Industry.

=== Other positions ===
- Founder of the Culture and Human rights commission of the Andorran Bar Association in 1983.
- Member of the Andorran Bar Council between 1986 and 1989.
- Member of the Executive Committee of the International Association of Young Lawyers (A.I.J.A.) from 1987 to 1990.
- Vice-president of the Human Rights sub-commission of the Parliamentary Assembly of the Council of Europe in 2004.
- President of the Council of Europe sub-commission about criminal problems and fight against terrorism in 2005. Re-elected at this position in April 2006 and January 2007.
- Representative of the members of parliament of the Council of Europe at the Group of States Against Corruption (GRECO)
- Since January 2007, he is, in addition, member of the bureau for the socialist group at the Parliamentary Assembly of the Council of Europe.

== Honours ==
- Grand-Cross of the Order of Prince Henry, Portugal (5 March 2010)

== Notes and references ==
Political offices
Preceded by Albert Pintat	Prime Minister of Andorra; 2009–2011	Succeeded by Pere López Agràs; Acting
