= Century 21 (political party) =

Defunct political party in Andorra

Century 21 Segle 21
- Founded: 2003
- Dissolved: 2005
- Merged into: New Centre
- Ideology: Conservatism
- Political position: Centre-right

Century 21 (Catalan: Segle 21) was a conservative political party in Andorra.

== History ==
The party first contested national elections in 2005, when it ran in alliance with the Andorran Democratic Centre. The alliance received 10.7% of the vote and won two seats.

In 2005 the parties merged to form the New Centre.
