= Democratic National Initiative =

Defunct political party of Andorra

The Democratic National Initiative (Catalan: Iniciativa Democràtica Nacional, IDN) was a political party in Andorra.

== History ==
Although political parties were not legalised until 1993, the party contested the 1992 elections in the Escaldes-Engordany parish, but failed to win a seat.

In the 1993 elections it received 15% of the vote and won two seats in the General Council. In the 1997 elections it saw its vote share fall to 11% but retained both seats. Thereafter the party did not contest any further elections. One of the party's former candidates, Antoni Crespo Travesset, joined the Democratic Party.
