= Andorran Democratic Centre =

Defunct political party in Andorra

Andorran Democratic Centre Centre Demòcrata Andorrà
- Split from: Democratic Party; Union for Progress
- Merged into: New Centre
- Ideology: Christian democracy
- Political position: Centre

The Andorran Democratic Centre (Catalan: Centre Demòcrata Andorrà) was a Christian-democratic political party in Andorra.

== History ==
The party first contested national elections in 2005, when it ran in coalition with Century 21. The alliance received 10.7% of the vote and won two seats.

In 2005, the two parties officially merged, creating New Centre.
