= New Democracy (Andorra) =

Defunct political party of Andorra

New Democracy (Catalan: Nova Democràcia, ND) was a political party in Andorra.

== History ==
The party was established in 1993 after political parties were legalised. In the elections that year it received 19.1% of the vote and won five seats, making it the joint second largest party in the General Council. In the 1997 elections the party was reduced to two seats. Thereafter it ceased to contest elections. The party was given consultative membership of the Socialist International at its XXI congress in 1999. Their former lead candidate Jaume Bartumeu Cassany joined the Social Democratic Party.
