= Marc Forné Molné =

3rd Prime Minister of Andorra from 1994 to 2005

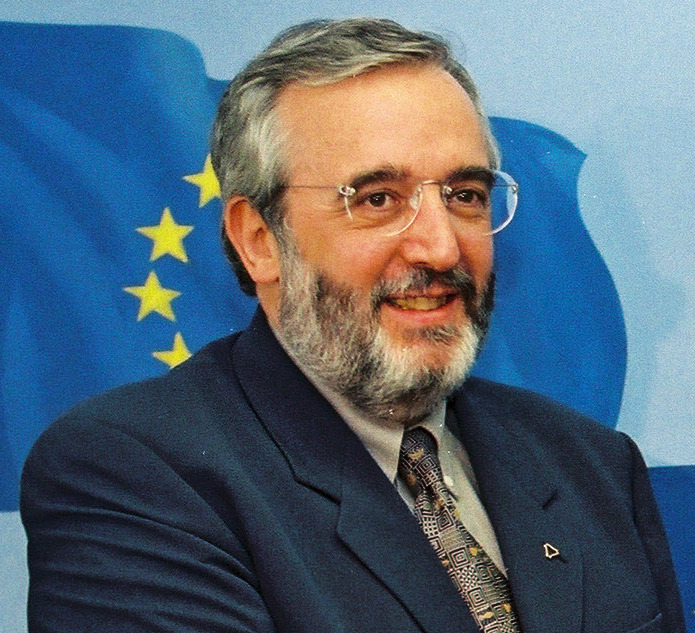
- Molné in 1997

Prime Minister of Andorra
- In office 7 December 1994 – 27 May 2005
- Monarchs: Episcopal Co-prince: Joan Martí i Alanis; Joan Enric Vives Sicília; French Co-prince: François Mitterrand; Jacques Chirac
- Representative: Episcopal: Nemesi Marqués Oste; French: Frédéric de Saint-Sernin; Philippe Massoni
- Preceded by: Òscar Ribas Reig
- Succeeded by: Albert Pintat

Personal details
- Born: 30 December 1946 (age 79) Andorra la Vella, Andorra
- Party: Liberal Party
- Spouse: Maria Lluísa Gispert Boronat

Marc Forné i Molné (Catalan: [ˈmaɾk fuɾˈnɛ i mulˈnɛ]; born 30 December 1946) was the prime minister of Andorra from 7 December 1994 to 27 May 2005. After 2 full terms, he was succeeded by Albert Pintat after Pintat won the April 2005 election. He is a lawyer by profession, and was president of the Liberal Party of Andorra (Partit Liberal d'Andorra).

== Biography ==
Marc Forné was born on 30 December 1946 in La Massana, the son of Antoni Forné i Jou, an Arfa-born lawyer and activist of the Workers' Party of Marxist Unification, and Joana Molné i Armengou, also born in La Massana.

He studied at the University of Barcelona where he graduated in law in 1974. Between 1969 and 1972, he worked as a civil servant in the Department of Public Services of the General Council of the Valls d'Andorra and from 1974, he worked as a criminal lawyer, sharing an office with his father and brother. In 1985, he joined the Liberal Party of Andorra.

For eleven years, he held the position of director of Andorra-7, a weekly newspaper in the Pyrenees valley that he founded in 1978. He was also the president of the Moto Club of the Principality of Andorra.

== Honours ==
- Spain: Knight Grand Cross of the Royal Order of Isabella the Catholic (02/06/2006).

Political offices
Preceded by Òscar Ribas Reig	Prime Minister of Andorra; 1994–2005	Succeeded by Albert Pintat
