= Andorra–Chile relations =

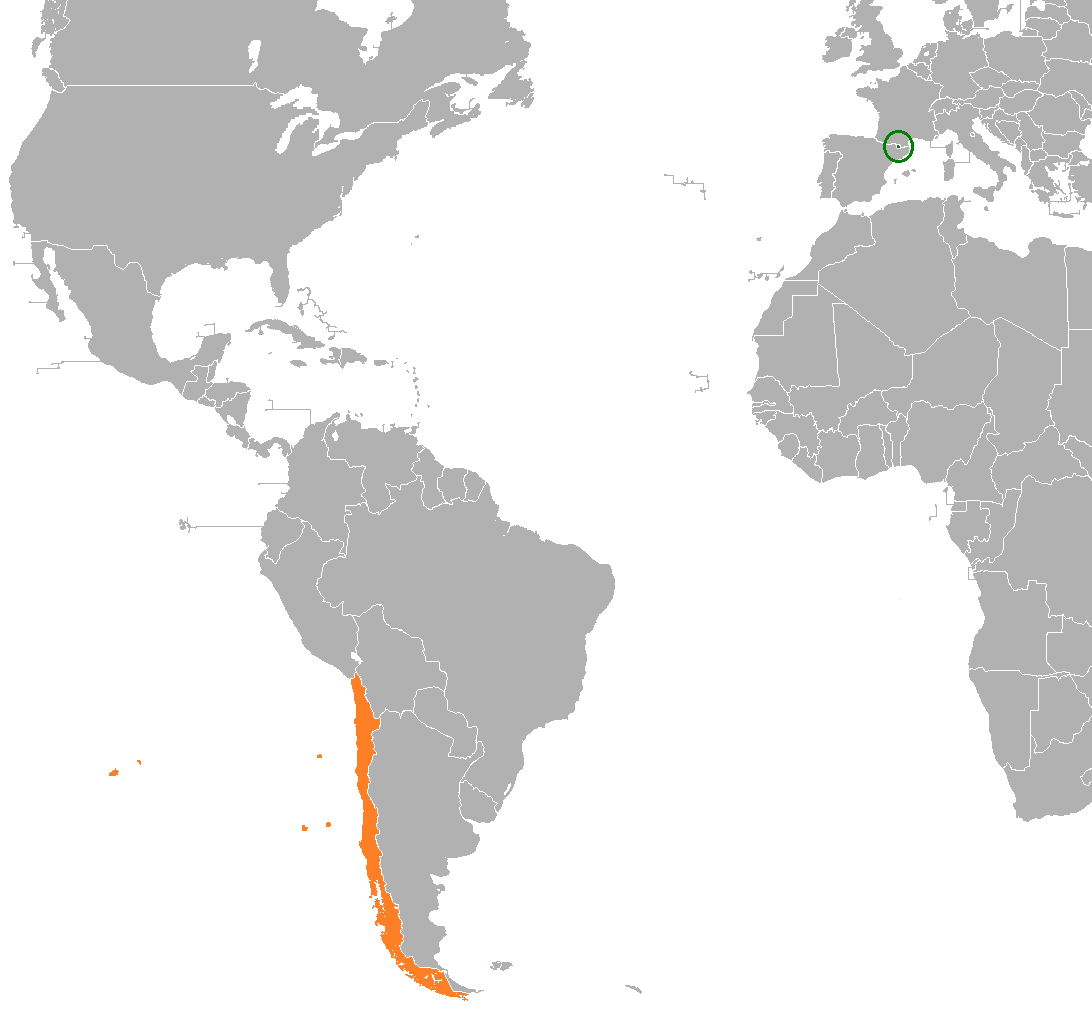
- Andorra: Chile

Andorra and Chile are members of the Organization of Ibero-American States and the United Nations.

== History ==
Andorra and Chile established diplomatic relations on 15 July 1996, after Andorra adopted a new constitution establishing them as a parliamentary democracy. Since establishing diplomatic relations; relations between both nations have been limited and have taken place primarily in multilateral forums. In November 2007, Andorran Prime Minister Albert Pintat paid a visit to Chile to attend the 17th Ibero-American Summit in Santiago.

In January 2014, Andorran Foreign Minister Gilbert Saboya Sunyé paid an official visit to Chile. During his visit, Foreign Minister met with Chilean Foreign Minister Alfredo Moreno Charme and both foreign ministers discussed the bilateral relations between both countries, especially in the tourist and business fields. In December 2014, during the 24th Ibero-American Summit in Veracruz City, Mexico; Andorran Prime Minister Antoni Martí met with Chilean President Michelle Bachelet. During the meeting, both leaders discussed different aspects of the bilateral relationship and outlined actions to be developed to deepen the bilateral relationship.

In January 2019, both nations signed an Agreement in Touristic Cooperation.

== High-level visits ==
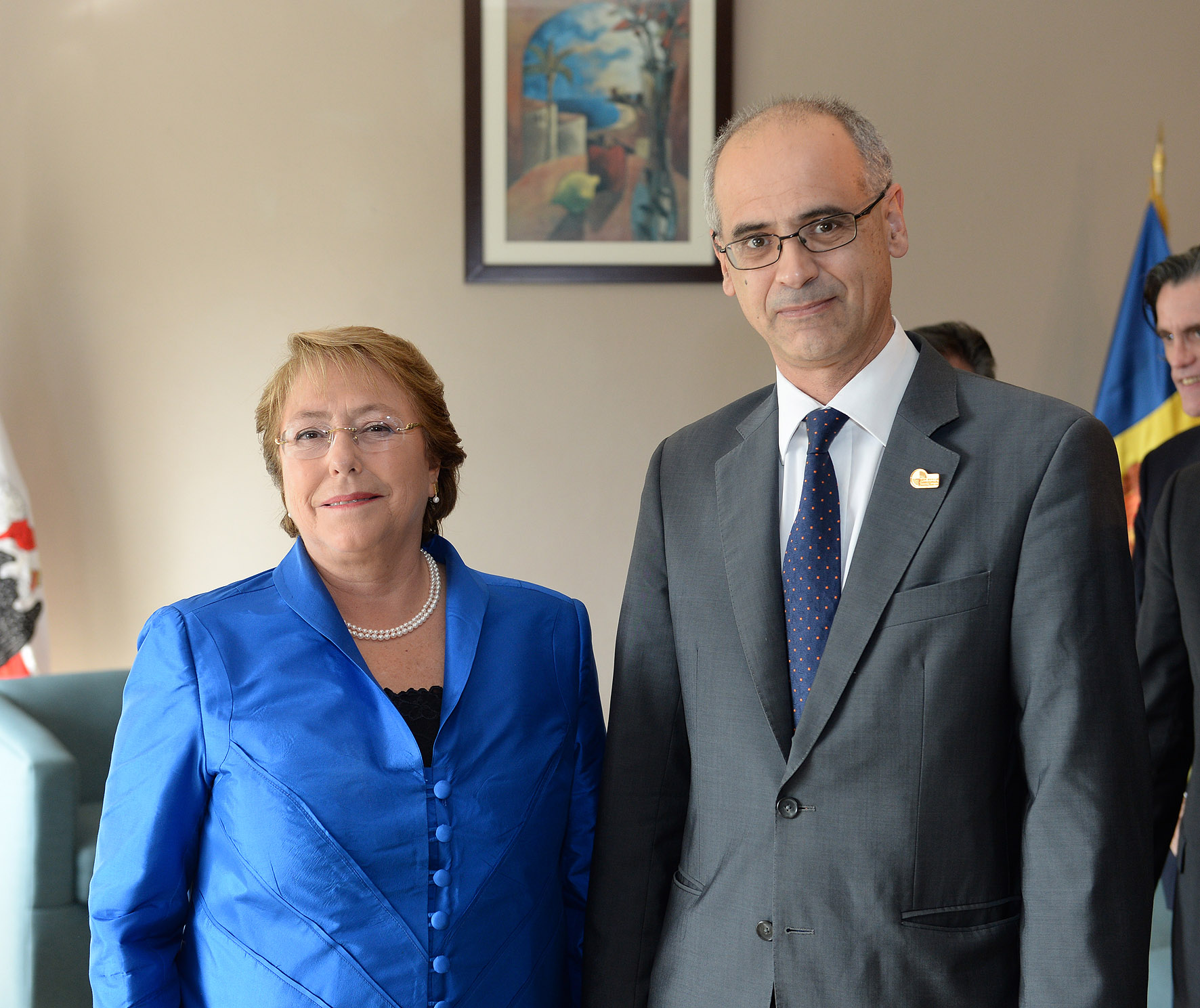
Chilean President Michelle Bachelet and Andorran Prime Minister Antoni Martí in Veracruz City, Mexico; 2014.

High-level visits from Andorra to Chile

- President Albert Pintat (2007)
- Foreign Minister Gilbert Saboya Sunyé (2014)

High-level visits from Chile to Andorra

- Deputy Minister of Tourism Mónica Zalaquett (2019)

== Trade ==
In 2017, trade between Andorra and Chile totaled US$662,000. Andorra's main exports to Chile include: integrated circuits, computers, insulated wires, electromagnets and footwear. Chile's main exports to Andorra include: musical instruments; microphones and headsets; and electrical machinery. Andorran multinational banking companies Andbank and Crèdit Andorrà operate in Chile.

== Diplomatic missions ==
- Andorra does not have an accreditation to Chile.
- Chile is accredited to Andorra from its embassy in Madrid, Spain and maintains an honorary consulate in Andorra la Vella.

== See also ==
- Foreign relations of Andorra
- Foreign relations of Chile
