= Andorra–Colombia relations =

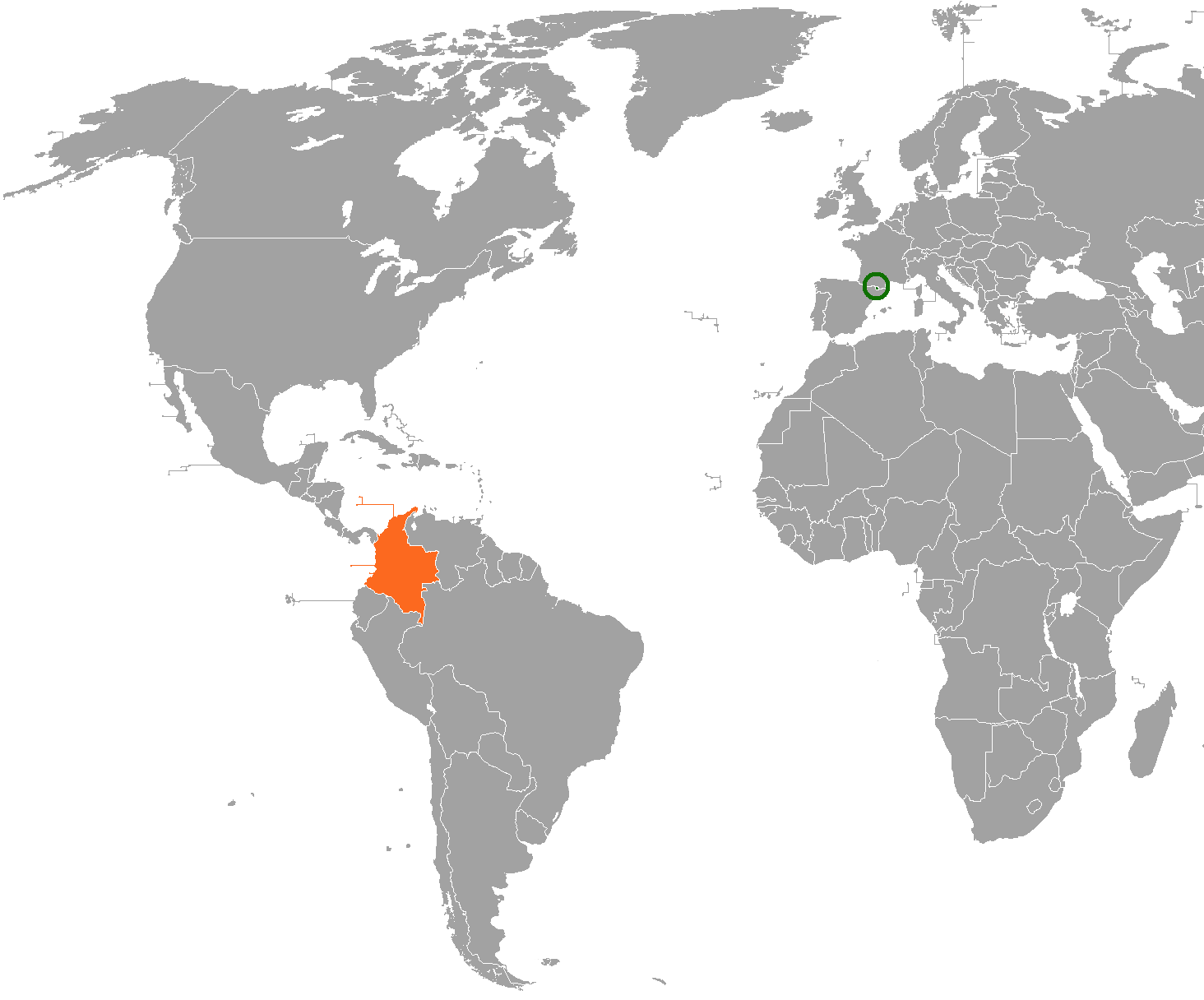
- Andorra: Colombia

The nations of Andorra and Colombia established diplomatic relations in 1995. Both nations are members of the Organization of Ibero-American States and the United Nations.

== History ==
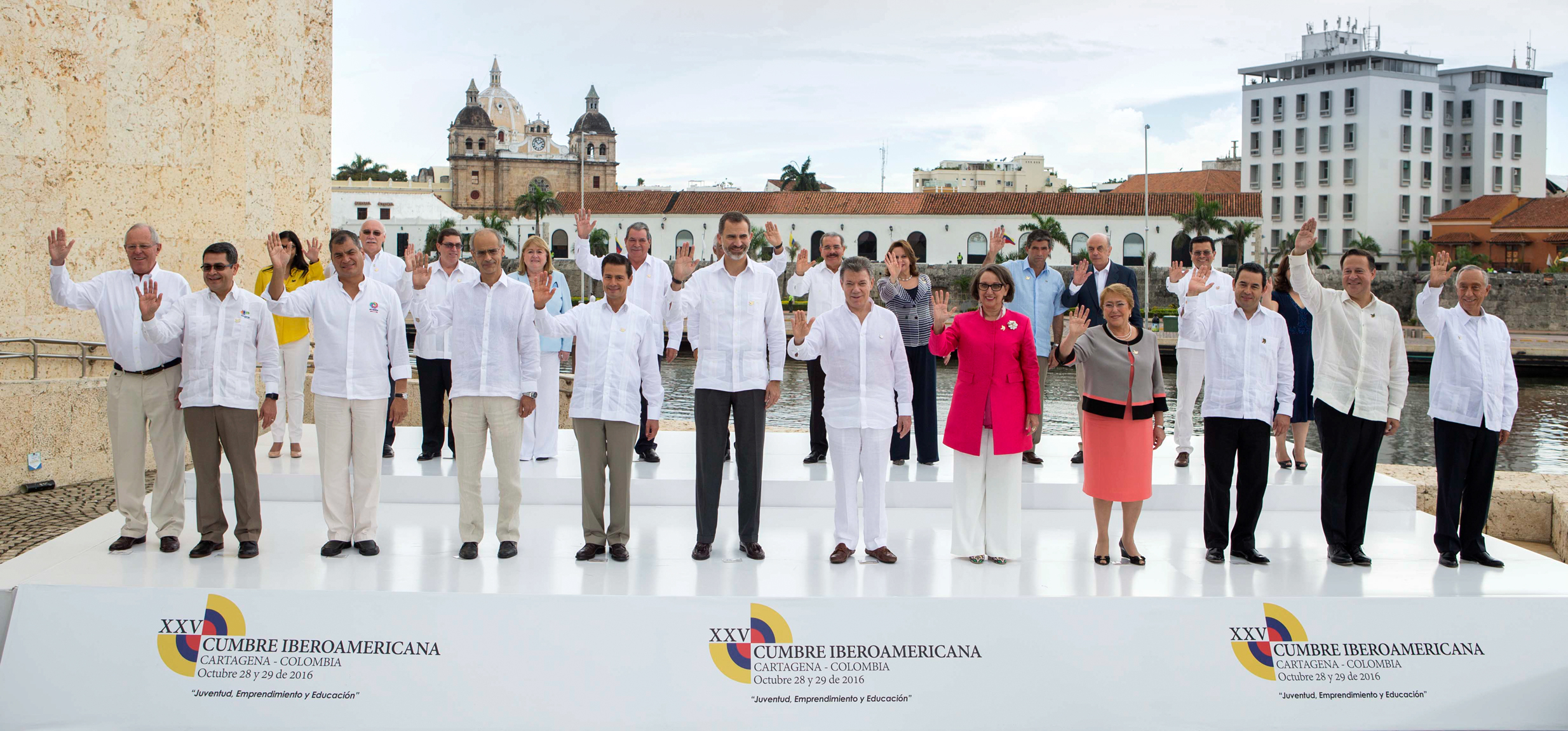
Andorran Prime Minister Antoni Martí along with Colombian President Juan Manuel Santos attending the XXV Iberoamerican Summit in Cartagena, Colombia; October 2016.

Andorra and Colombia established diplomatic relations on 27 November 1995, after Andorra adopted a new constitution establishing them as a parliamentary democracy.

In February 2013, Colombian Foreign Minister María Ángela Holguín paid a visit to Andorra and met with Prime Minister Antoni Martí. In October 2013, Andorran Foreign Minister Gilbert Saboya Sunyé traveled to Bogotá and met with his counterpart María Ángela Holguín. During the visit, both nations signed a Memorandum of Understanding on Tourism between the Colombian Ministry of Commerce, Industry and Tourism and the Andorran Ministry of Tourism and Environment.

In October 2016, Andorran Prime Minister Antoni Martí and Foreign Minister Gilbert Saboya Sunyé paid a visit to Cartagena, Colombia to attend the 25th Ibero-American Summit. There have been other high level visits between both nations, primarily in the sidelines of the annual United Nations General Assembly reunions in New York City.

In 2019, both nations signed an Inter-institutional Memorandum of Understanding between the Colombian Administrative Department of the Public Service and the Andorran Ministry of Public Service and Administrative Reform.

In 2025, both nations celebrated 30 years of diplomatic relations.

== High-level visits ==
High-level visits from Andorra to Colombia

- Foreign Minister Gilbert Saboya Sunyé (2013, 2016)
- Prime Minister Antoni Martí (2016)

High-level visits from Colombia to Andorra

- Foreign Minister María Ángela Holguín (2013)

== Diplomatic missions ==
- Andorra does not have an accreditation to Colombia.
- Colombia is accredited to Andorra from its embassy in Madrid, Spain.

== See also ==
- Foreign relations of Andorra
- Foreign relations of Colombia
