= Andorra–Mexico relations =

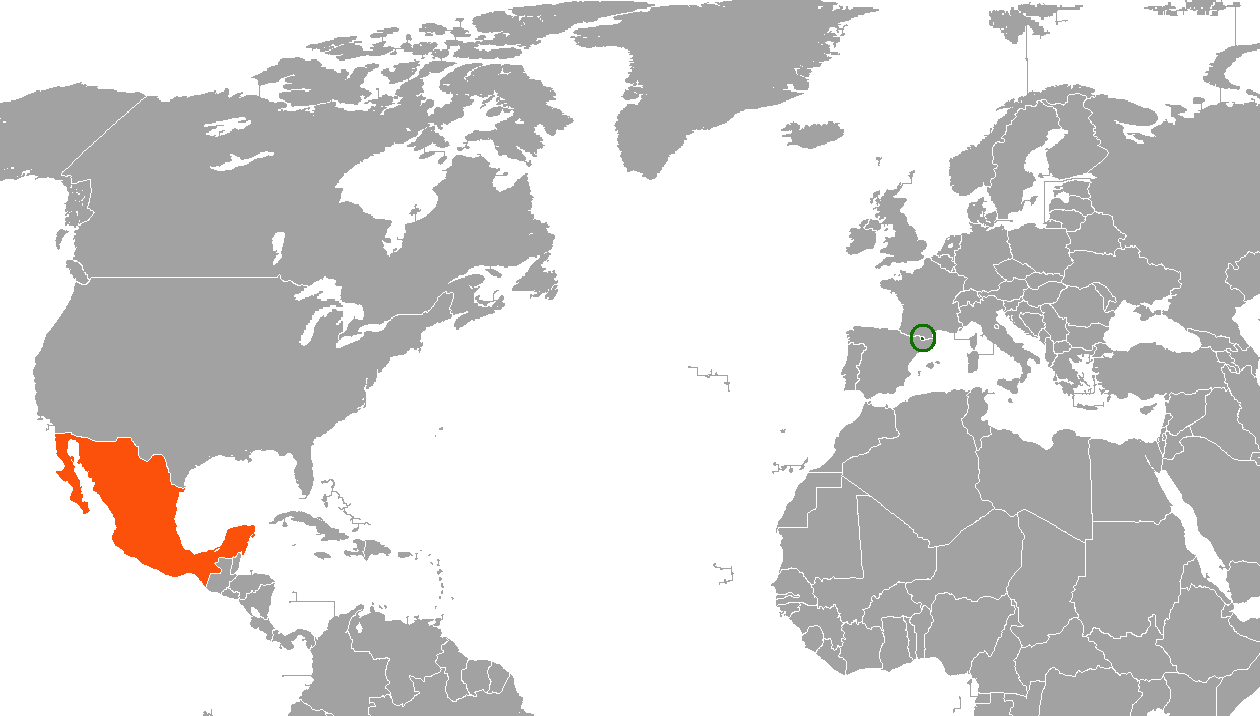

- Andorra: Mexico

The nations of Andorra and Mexico established diplomatic relations in 1995. Both nations are members of the Organization of Ibero-American States and the United Nations.

== History ==
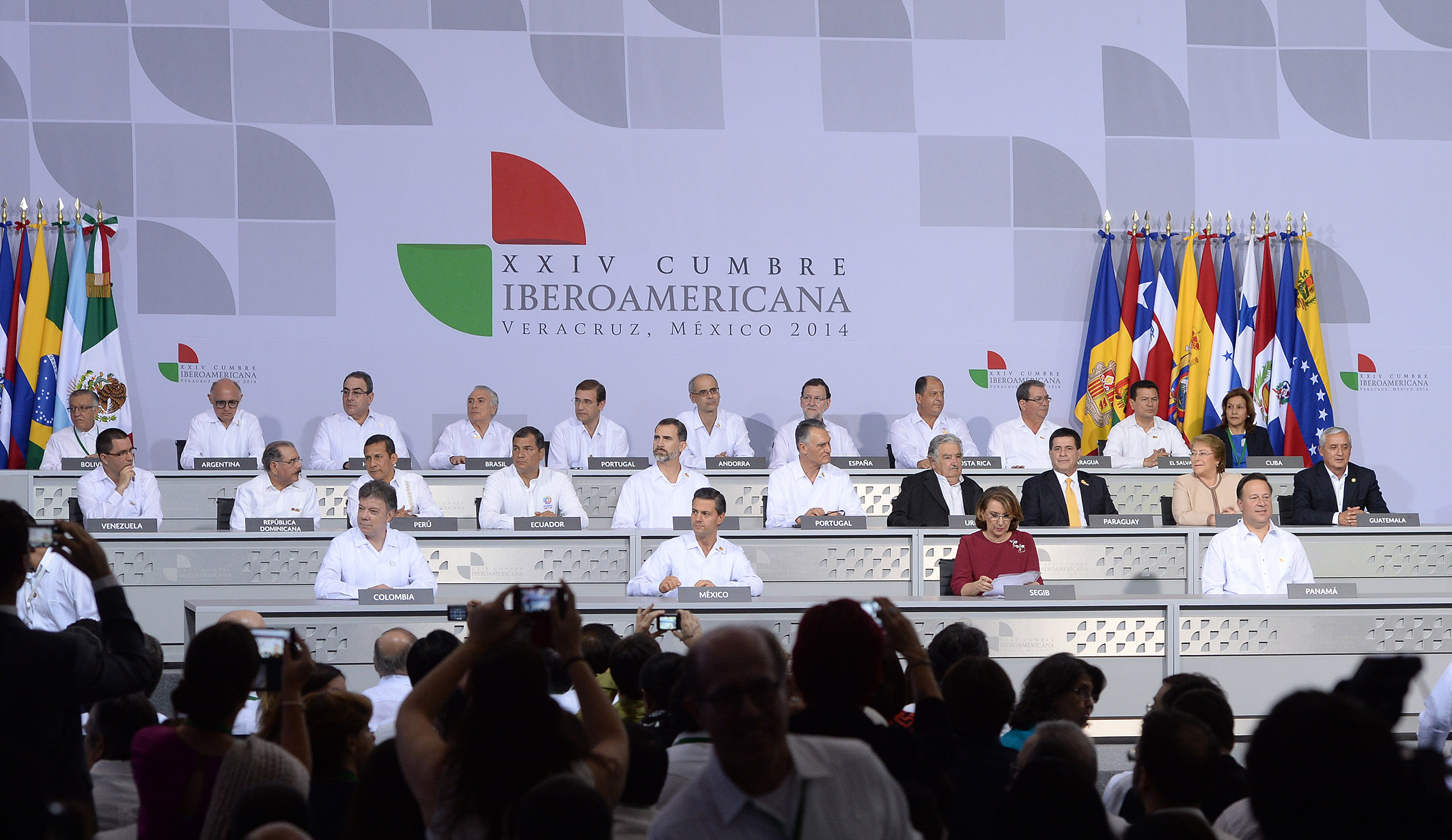
Andorran President Antoni Martí attending the 24th Ibero-American Summit in Veracruz City, Mexico; December 2014.

Andorra and Mexico, encouraged by the desire to develop friendly links among their peoples and to cooperate in the political, economic, commercial and cultural spheres, agreed to establish diplomatic relations on 5 May 1995 after Andorra adopted a new constitution establishing them as a parliamentary democracy. The establishment of diplomatic relations between both nations took place in New York City, during an act in which the representatives of both countries to the United Nations signed a joint communiqué. Mexico soon accredited an ambassador to Andorra based in Madrid, Spain.

In December 2014, Andorran President Antoni Martí paid a visit to Mexico to attend the 24th Ibero-American Summit in Veracruz City. While in Mexico, President Martí met with Mexican President Enrique Peña Nieto. The meeting was also attended by Andorran Foreign Minister Gilbert Saboya Sunyé. In September 2018, both nations signed a Memorandum of Understanding of cooperation between the Andorran General Prosecutor's Office and the Mexican Attorney General (PGR).

Andorra, being known as a tax haven; there have been situations where some Mexicans have traveled to the nation to open bank accounts in the country to either hide and/or launder money. In 2016, Banca Privada d'Andorra was discovered to be holding $6 million USD in a private bank account of a Mexican congress man from the state of Sinaloa. It is speculated that the money was from the Sinaloa Cartel. In 2017, a Mexican ambassador in Uruguay, Francisco Arroyo Vieyra, was found to have hidden $1 million USD in an Andorran bank account. In 2023, it was discovered that a former Mexican governor from the state of Sinaloa, Juan Sigfrido Millán Lizárraga, hid $4.5 million USD in an Andorran bank account.

In 2025, both nations celebrated 30 years of diplomatic relations.

== Trade ==
In 2023, trade between Andorra and Mexico totaled US$1 million. Andorra's main exports to Mexico include: plastic manufactures, electrical equipment, machinery and packaging materiales. Mexico's main exports to Andorra include: chocolates and motor vehicles. Between 1999 and 2012, Andorra invested US$2.5 million in Mexico with most of its investments concentrated in the construction and financial services sector, as well as pipe fittings and stainless steel sectors. Andorran multinational banking companies Andbank and Crèdit Andorrà operate in Mexico. Mexican multinational company, Cemex, operates in Andorra.

== Diplomatic missions ==
- Andorra is accredited to Mexico from its embassy based in New York City, United States.
- Mexico is accredited to Andorra from its embassy in Madrid, Spain and maintains an honorary consulate in Andorra la Vella.

== See also ==
- Foreign relations of Andorra
- Foreign relations of Mexico
