= Andorra–Portugal relations =

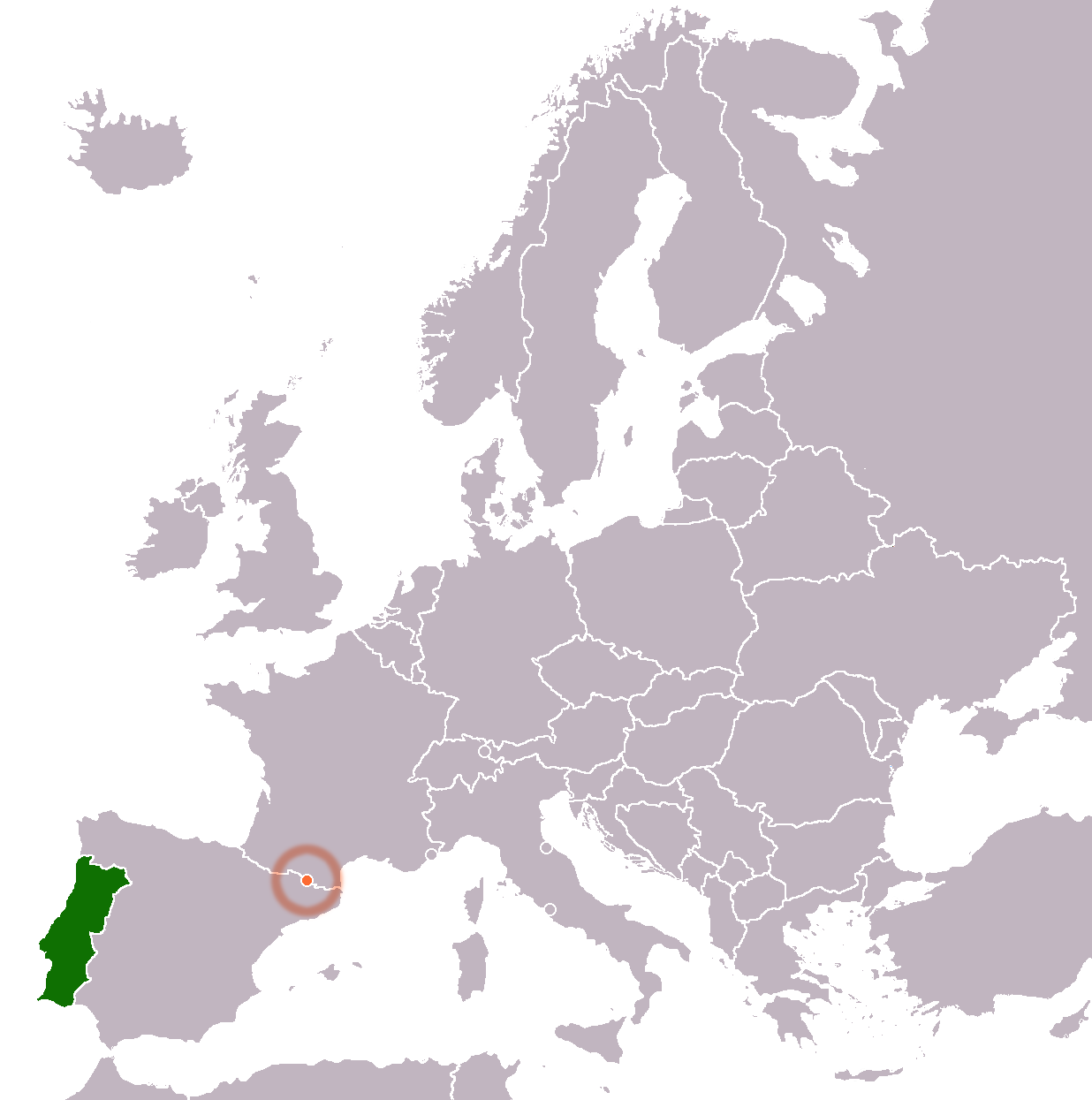
- Andorra: Portugal

Andorra and Portugal are members of the Council of Europe, Organization of Ibero-American States and the United Nations.

== History ==
Andorra and Portugal are two European nations sharing the Iberian Peninsula (along with Spain) with similar histories. Due to it size, Andorra was heavily influenced by both France and Spain and administered by the bishop of Urgell in Catalonia (Spain) and by the president of France. Andorra and Portugal have long-standing historical social, cultural, political and economic relations, which grew especially since the 1980s, when the great Portuguese migration to Andorra began. On 22 December 1994 both nations established diplomatic relations after Andorra adopted a new constitution establishing them as a parliamentary democracy. In 2003, Portugal opened a resident embassy in Andorra la Vella, however, the embassy was closed in 2012 due to financial restraints.

The strong presence of the Portuguese community in Andorra, which currently represents around 14% of the population of Andorra, contributed to a strong relationship between both nations. In November 2009, Andorran Prime Minister Jaume Bartumeu paid a visit to Estoril, Portugal to attend the 19th Ibero-American Summit. In March 2010, Portuguese President Aníbal Cavaco Silva paid an official visit to Andorra, the first by a Portuguese head-of-state. In September 2017, Portuguese President Marcelo Rebelo de Sousa paid a visit to Andorra. The visit was reciprocated by Andorran Prime Minister Antoni Martí in 2018.

In 2019, both nations celebrated 25 years of diplomatic relations. In February 2026, Portugal opened a consulate-general in Andorra la Vella.

== High level-visits ==
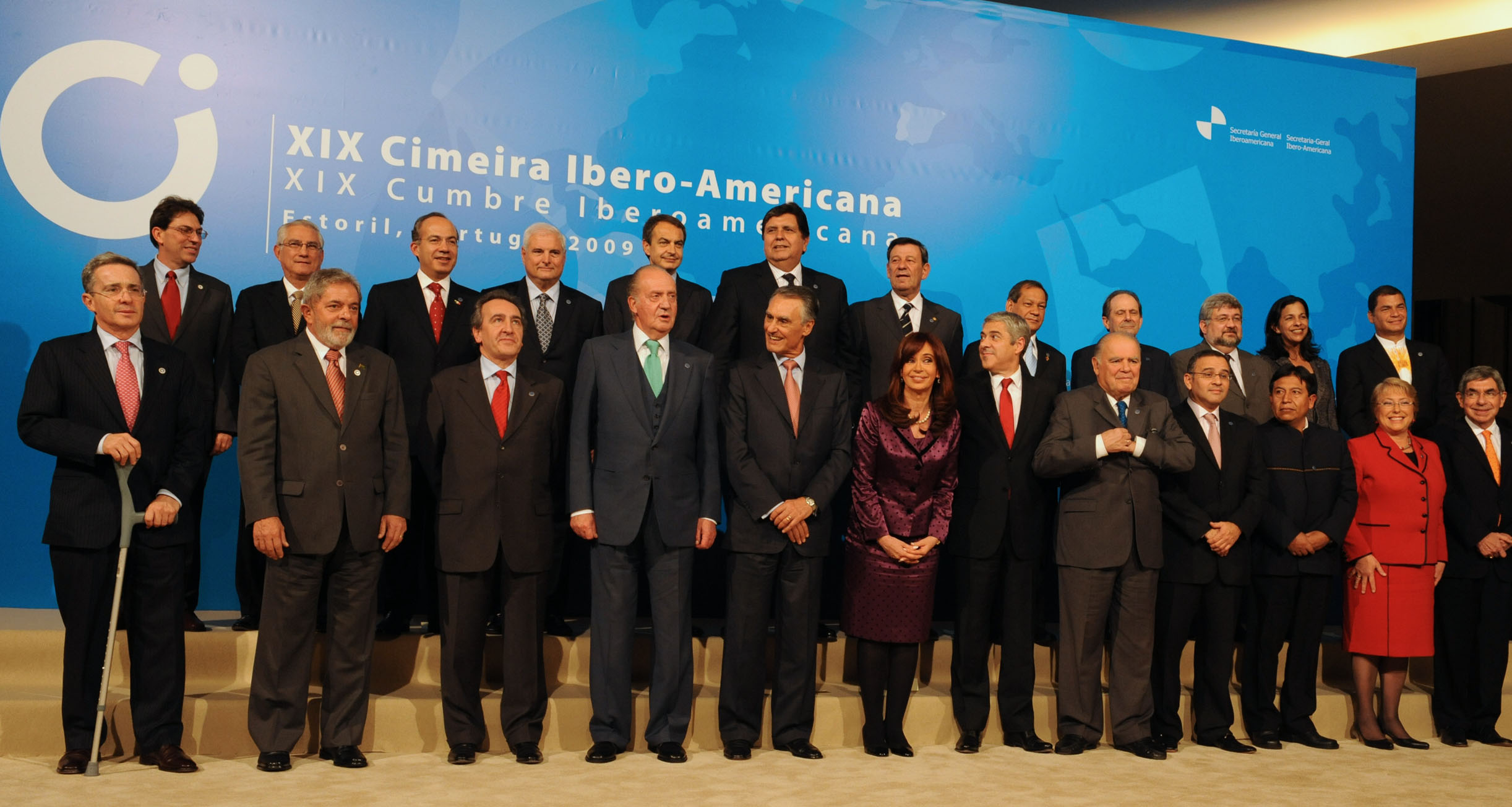
Andorran Prime Minister Jaume Bartumeu attending the 19th Ibero-American Summit in Estoril, Portugal; 2009.

High-level visits from Andorra to Portugal

- Prime Minister Albert Pintat (2006)
- Prime Minister Jaume Bartumeu (2009, 2011)
- Foreign Minister Gilbert Saboya Sunyé (2016)
- Prime Minister Antoni Martí (2018)
- Prime Minister Xavier Espot Zamora (2020)

High-level visits from Portugal to Andorra

- President Aníbal Cavaco Silva (2010)
- President Marcelo Rebelo de Sousa (2017, 2021)

== Bilateral agreements ==
Both nations have signed a few agreements such as an Agreement on social security (1988); Agreement on the respective application modalities (1988); Agreement for Educational Cooperation (2000); Agreement on international road transport of passengers and goods (2000); Agreement on the entry, circulation, stay and establishment of the nationals of each country in the territory of the other (2007); Agreement for on the exchange of information on tax matters (2009) and an Agreement to avoid double taxation and prevent tax evasion (2015).

== Trade ==
In 2018, trade between both nations totaled €3.3 million Euros. Andorra's main export products include: food and beverages and industrial supplies. Portugal's main export products include: food and beverages; wood, cork and paper; textiles and clothing; machinery and parts; and land transport equipment and parts.

== Resident diplomatic missions ==
- Andorra has an embassy in Lisbon.
- Portugal is accredited to Andorra through its embassy in Madrid, Spain and maintains a consulate-general in Andorra la Vella.

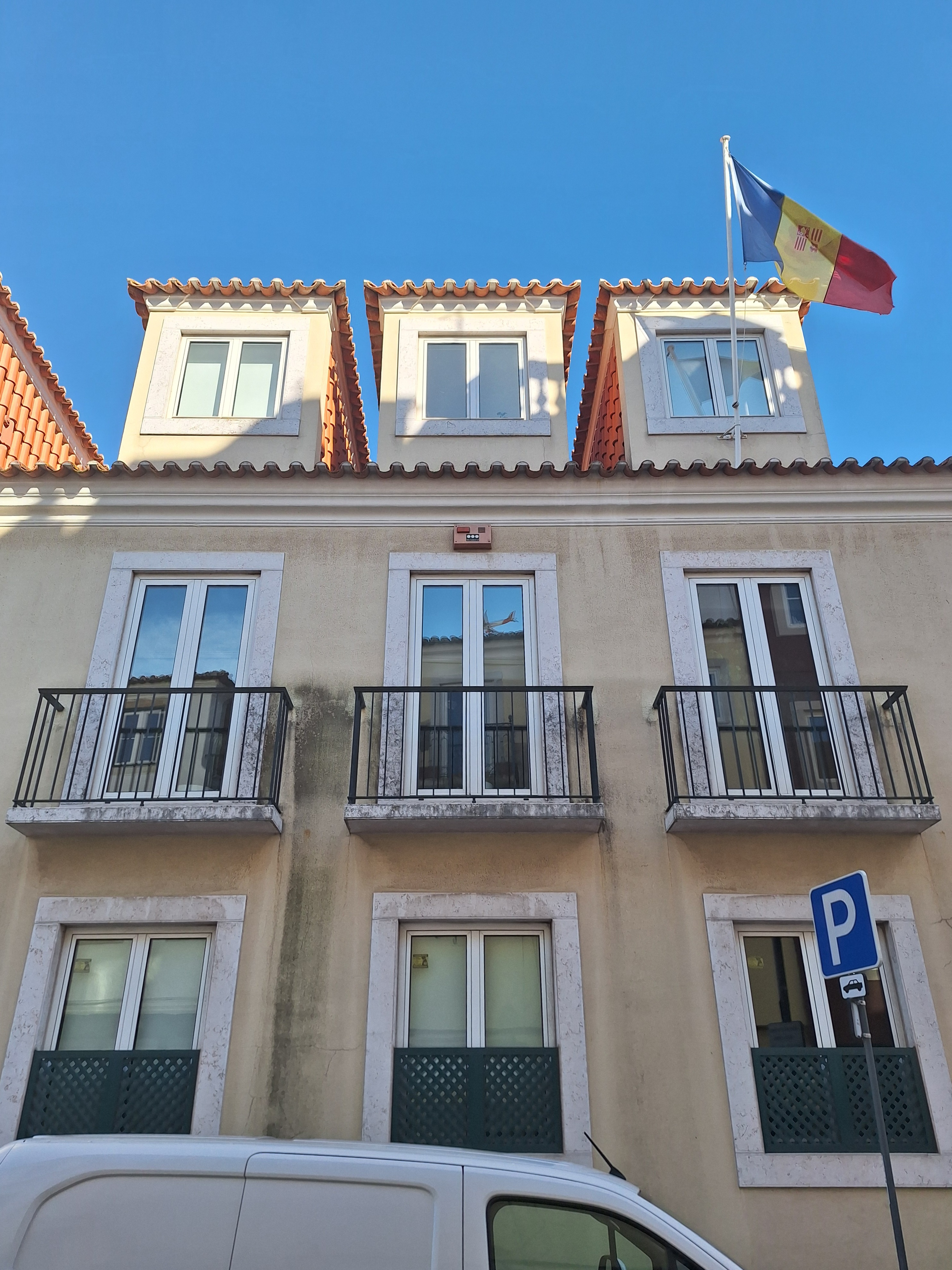
Embassy of Andorra in Lisbon

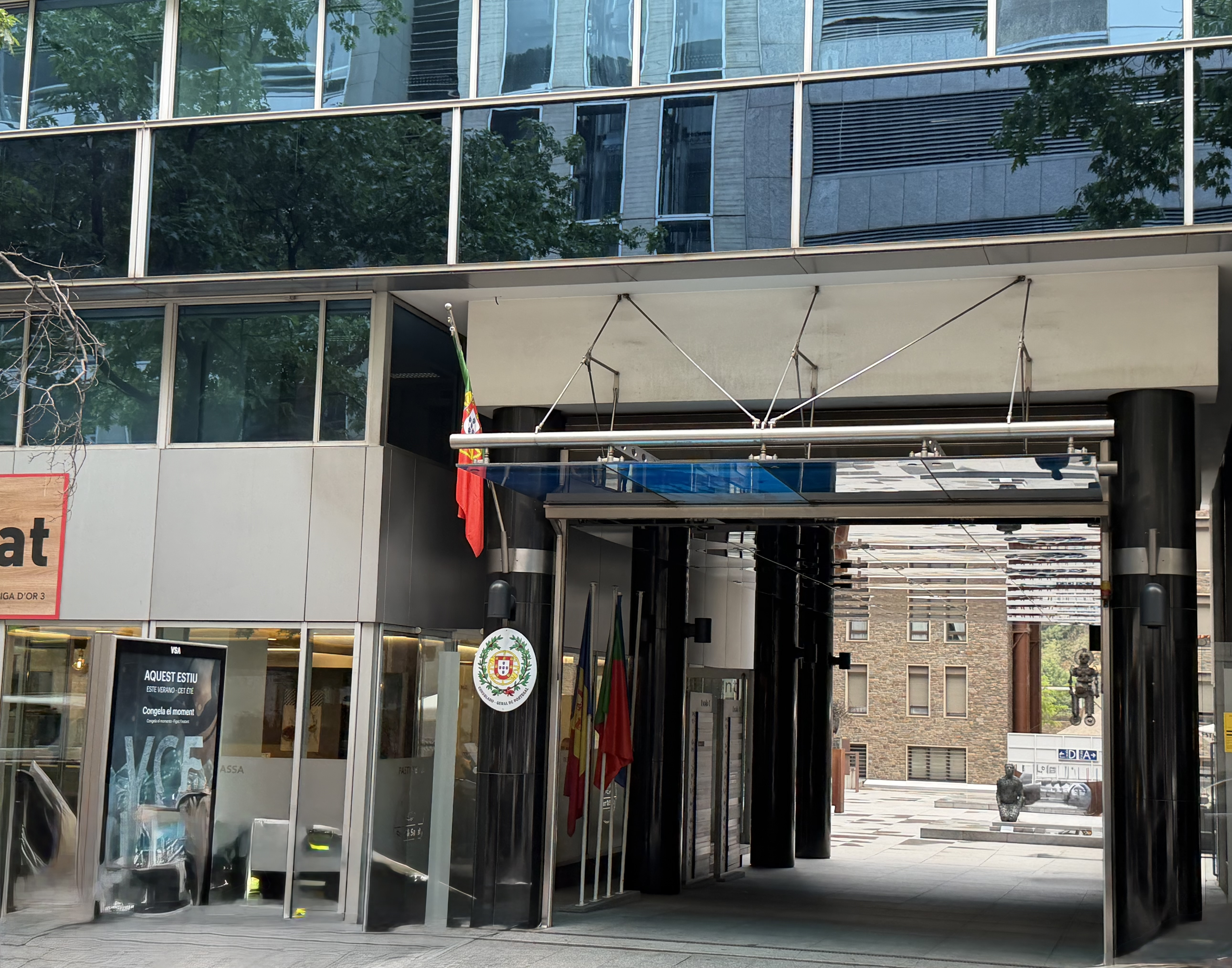
Consulate-General of Portugal in Andorra la Vella

== See also ==
- Foreign relations of Andorra
- Foreign relations of Portugal
