= Andorra–Argentina relations =

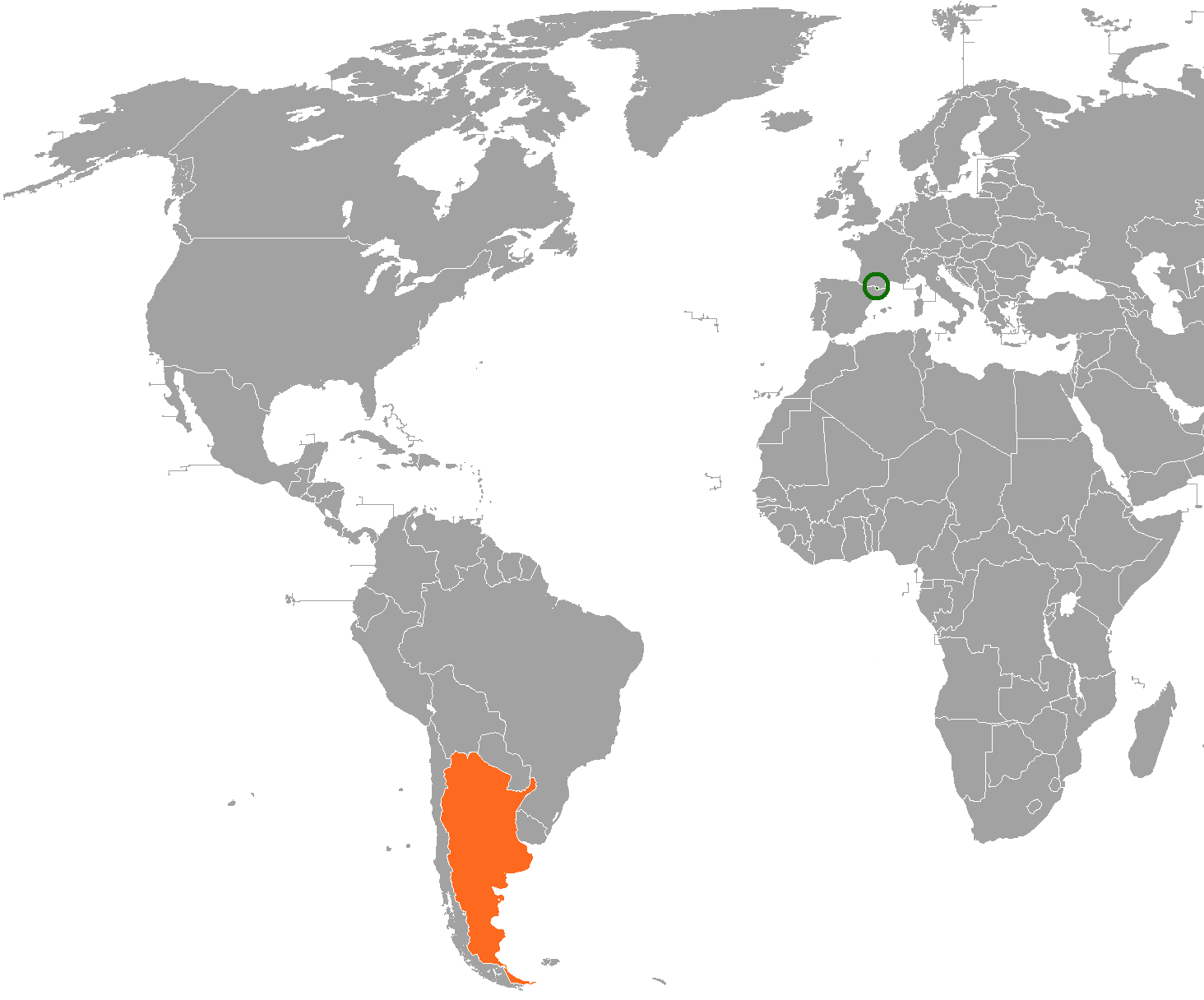
- Andorra: Argentina

Andorra and Argentina are members of the Organization of Ibero-American States and the United Nations.

== History ==
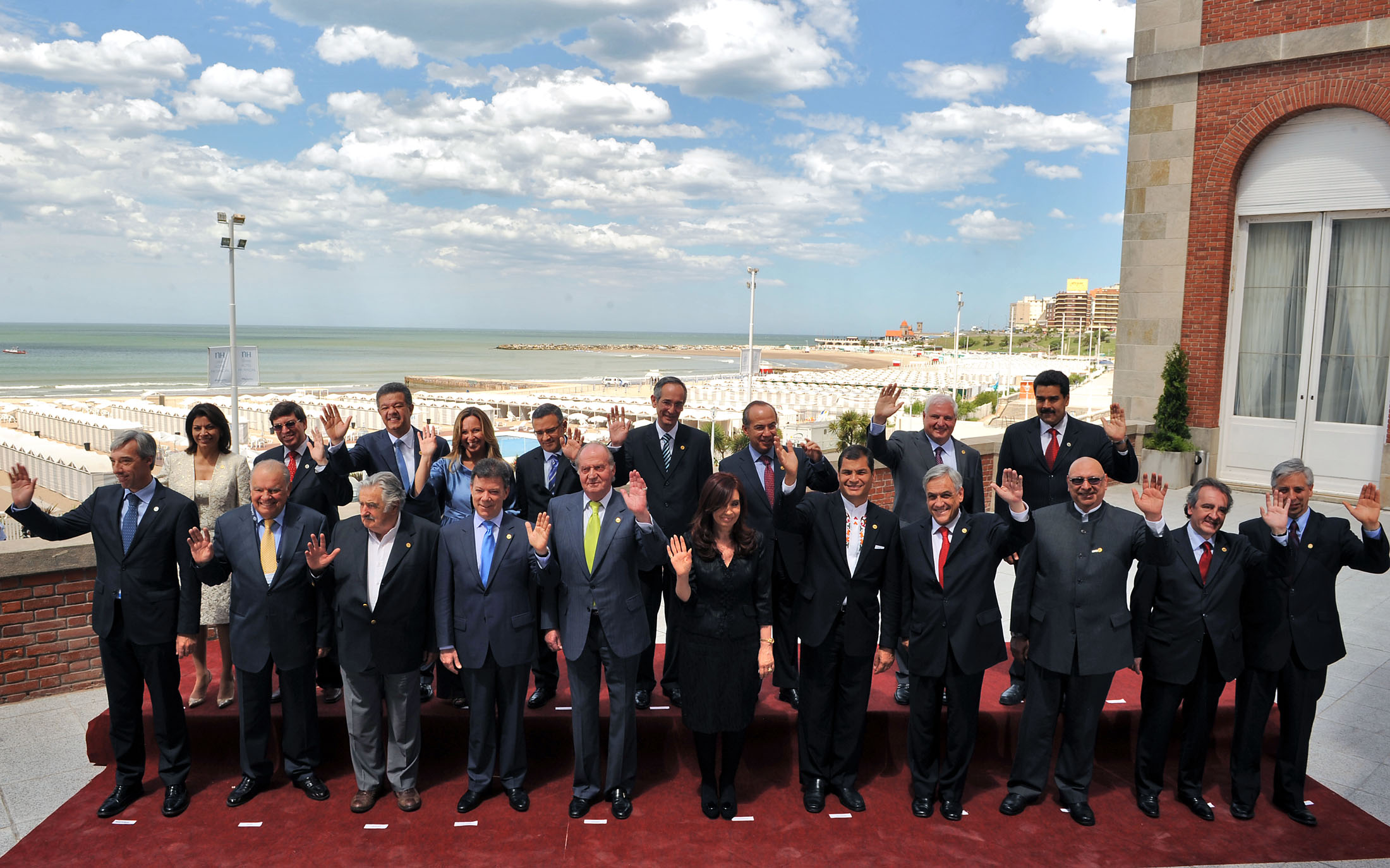
Andorran Prime Minister Jaume Bartumeu along with Argentine President Cristina Fernández de Kirchner at the 20th Ibero-American Summit in Mar del Plata, Argentina; December 2010.

Andorra and Argentina established diplomatic relations on 26 April 1995, after Andorra adopted a new constitution establishing them as a parliamentary democracy. Since establishing diplomatic relations; relations between both nations have been limited and have taken place primarily in multilateral forums. In March 2010, both nations signed an Agreement for the exchange of information in tax matters.

In December 2010, Andorran Prime Minister Jaume Bartumeu paid a visit to Mar del Plata, Argentina to attend the 20th Ibero-American Summit. In September 2017, Argentine Foreign Minister Jorge Faurie and Andorran Foreign Minister Maria Ubach i Font, met at the United Nations General Assembly in New York. During the meeting, both ministers agreed to increase bilateral relations in all areas and levels.

In February 2018, Argentine General Undersecretary to the Presidency, Valentín Díaz Gilligan, was accused of having an undisclosed secret bank account in Andorra and for money laundering. Mr. Díaz Gilligan soon resigned due to the scandal.

== Trade ==
In 2017, the total trade between Andorra and Argentina amounted to US$43,000. Andorra's main exports to Argentina include: thermostats, transmissions, centrifuges, excavation machinery, and other heating machinery. Argentina's main export to Andorra is furskin apparel.

== Diplomatic missions ==
- Andorra does not have an accreditation to Argentina.
- Argentina is accredited to Andorra from its embassy in Madrid, Spain.

== See also ==
- Foreign relations of Andorra
- Foreign relations of Argentina
