= Andorra–Peru relations =

- Andorra: Peru

Andorra–Peru relations refers to the bilateral relations between the Principality of Andorra and the Republic of Peru. Both countries are members of the Organization of Ibero-American States and the United Nations, and participate in the Ibero-American Summit.

== History ==
Bilateral relations between Andorra and Peru were formally established on June 3, 1997. Bilateral relations have been limited to their contacts at the United Nations and the Organization of Ibero-American States.

Before the formal establishment of relations, the only citizen of Andorra to live in Peru was Eduardo Vilanova, a mining industrialist from the coal mining area of Chimbote who first arrived to Peru in 1955 and whose French wife, Marie Francine de Vilanova, was the owner of Douce France, a restaurant in Miraflores.

In 2008, Peru established an honorary consulate in Andorra, headed by the Spaniard Gerardo Gutiérrez.

Andorra assisted Peru during the corruption case involving Brazilian company Odebrecht by seizing the bank accounts of Edwin Luyo and Santiago Chau, two former government officials of Alan García. A similar situation occurred in 2022. Peruvian fiscal and chief of the International Judicial Cooperation and Extraditions Unit of the Public Ministry of Peru, Alonso Peña, noted that cooperation between both countries over the legal case was continuous and positive, as 80% of information requests sent by Peru to the microstate were positively answered despite the fact that no cooperation treaty exists between both states.

== Diplomatic missions ==
- Andorra does not have a diplomatic mission accredited to Peru.
- Peru's is accredited to Andorra from its embassy in Madrid and has an honorary consulate in Andorra.

== See also ==
- Foreign relations of Andorra
- Foreign relations of Peru
- Peru–Spain relations
