= Foreign relations of Andorra =

Since the establishment of sovereignty with the ratification of the constitution in 1993, Andorra has moved to become an active member of the international community. In July 1993, Andorra established its first diplomatic mission in the world to the United Nations.

Foreign affairs are supervised by the Ministry of External Affairs.

== Memberships ==
Andorra is a full member of the United Nations (UN), United Nations Educational, Scientific and Cultural Organization (UNESCO), United Nations Conference on Trade and Development (UNCTAD), International Criminal Court (ICC), International Centre for the Study of the Preservation and Restoration of Cultural Property (ICCROM), International Telecommunication Union (ITU), International Red Cross, Universal Copyright Convention, Council of Europe, World Tourism Organization, Organization for Security and Cooperation in Europe (OSCE), Customs Cooperation Council (CCC), and Interpol. Since 1991, Andorra has had a special agreement with the European Union.

== Diplomatic relations ==
List of countries which Andorra maintains diplomatic relations with:

#	Country	Date
1	France	3 June 1993
2	Spain	3 June 1993
3	Netherlands	14 December 1993
4	Germany	2 March 1994
5	United Kingdom	9 March 1994
6	Israel	13 April 1994
7	Denmark	4 May 1994
8	Bulgaria	17 June 1994
9	China	29 June 1994
10	India	22 November 1994
11	Belgium	15 December 1994
12	Portugal	22 December 1994
13	Ireland	18 January 1995
14	Italy	1 February 1995
15	United States	21 February 1995
16	Marshall Islands	23 February 1995
17	South Korea	23 February 1995
18	Hungary	1 March 1995
19	Australia	2 March 1995
20	Sweden	16 March 1995
21	Greece	17 March 1995
22	Austria	20 March 1995
23	South Africa	22 March 1995
24	Paraguay	23 March 1995
25	Luxembourg	7 April 1995
26	Argentina	26 April 1995
27	Croatia	28 April 1995
28	Mexico	5 May 1995
29	Russia	13 June 1995
30	Bolivia	14 June 1995
—	Holy See	16 June 1995
31	Cyprus	29 June 1995
32	Nicaragua	29 June 1995
33	Slovenia	13 July 1995
34	Malta	24 July 1995
35	Iceland	3 August 1995
36	New Zealand	3 August 1995
37	Finland	23 August 1995
38	Liechtenstein	1 September 1995
39	Switzerland	6 September 1995
40	Cuba	19 October 1995
41	Japan	20 October 1995
42	Colombia	2 November 1995
43	Canada	15 November 1995
44	Norway	15 November 1995
45	Guatemala	27 November 1995
46	San Marino	30 November 1995
47	Albania	15 February 1996
48	Venezuela	7 March 1996
49	Indonesia	26 March 1996
50	Bosnia and Herzegovina	28 March 1996
51	Estonia	11 April 1996
52	Azerbaijan	30 April 1996
53	Ecuador	7 May 1996
54	Poland	15 May 1996
55	Costa Rica	22 May 1996
56	Romania	6 June 1996
57	Czech Republic	3 July 1996
58	Slovakia	3 July 1996
59	Brazil	9 July 1996
60	Chile	15 July 1996
61	Panama	16 July 1996
62	Ukraine	19 August 1996
63	Latvia	27 August 1996
64	Honduras	18 September 1996
65	Moldova	9 October 1996
66	Uruguay	27 November 1996
67	Morocco	3 December 1996
68	Egypt	25 February 1997
69	Lithuania	13 May 1997
70	Peru	3 June 1997
71	Singapore	18 September 1997
72	El Salvador	14 May 1998
73	Turkey	8 October 1998
74	Lebanon	24 March 1999
75	Philippines	22 February 2000
76	Jordan	3 March 2000
77	Thailand	28 April 2000
78	Seychelles	28 April 2000
79	Dominican Republic	14 September 2000
80	Pakistan	22 July 2003
81	Armenia	18 November 2003
82	Algeria	29 March 2005
83	Burkina Faso	18 May 2005
84	Gabon	31 January 2006
85	Cambodia	8 March 2006
86	Benin	24 March 2006
87	Afghanistan	29 March 2006
88	Georgia	5 April 2006
89	Cape Verde	30 June 2006
90	Monaco	7 July 2006
91	Montenegro	28 July 2006
92	Nepal	22 September 2006
93	Tunisia	20 November 2006
94	Senegal	20 December 2006
95	Mauritius	21 December 2006
96	Haiti	19 January 2007
97	Bahrain	4 May 2007
98	Bangladesh	9 May 2007
99	Qatar	15 May 2007
100	Burundi	30 May 2007
101	Serbia	1 June 2007
102	Laos	8 June 2007
103	Vietnam	12 June 2007
104	Tajikistan	9 November 2007
105	Kazakhstan	30 January 2008
106	Oman	10 March 2008
107	Uganda	11 March 2008
108	Kuwait	17 March 2008
109	Turkmenistan	17 April 2008
110	Maldives	19 May 2008
111	Comoros	8 July 2008
112	United Arab Emirates	23 September 2008
113	Myanmar	11 February 2009
114	Djibouti	17 March 2009
115	Saudi Arabia	19 March 2009
116	Angola	20 March 2009
117	São Tomé and Príncipe	27 May 2009
118	North Macedonia	31 July 2009
119	Uzbekistan	1 December 2009
120	Saint Vincent and the Grenadines	1 April 2010
121	Cameroon	21 October 2010
122	Ghana	31 March 2011
123	Antigua and Barbuda	3 June 2011
124	Brunei	16 June 2011
—	Kosovo	14 September 2011
125	Timor-Leste	20 September 2011
126	Belarus	27 September 2011
127	Mongolia	21 November 2011
128	Bhutan	23 March 2012
129	Tuvalu	9 November 2012
130	Mauritania	16 September 2013
131	Fiji	27 September 2013
132	Jamaica	23 September 2014
133	Kyrgyzstan	25 September 2014
134	Trinidad and Tobago	26 September 2014
135	Iran	30 September 2015
136	Sri Lanka	30 November 2016
137	Togo	21 November 2017
138	Belize	26 February 2018
139	Madagascar	25 September 2018
140	Palau	25 September 2018
141	Rwanda	14 November 2018
142	Mozambique	15 January 2019
143	Bahamas	31 October 2019
144	Dominica	30 April 2021
145	Kiribati	27 May 2021
146	Barbados	21 June 2021
147	Kenya	16 February 2022
148	Republic of the Congo	24 February 2022
149	Guinea-Bissau	5 April 2022
150	Saint Kitts and Nevis	21 September 2022
151	Niger	18 November 2022
152	Saint Lucia	20 September 2023
153	Vanuatu	30 November 2023
154	Malaysia	25 September 2024
155	Namibia	25 September 2024
156	Ivory Coast	16 December 2024
157	Zimbabwe	20 May 2025
—	Sovereign Military Order of Malta	16 June 2025
158	Grenada	24 September 2025
159	Solomon Islands	24 September 2025
160	Democratic Republic of the Congo	23 February 2026
161	Botswana	26 August 2026
162	Central African Republic	21 September 2026
163	Guyana	21 September 2026
164	Sierra Leone	21 September 2026
165	Eritrea	22 September 2026
166	Zambia	22 September 2026
167	Malawi	24 September 2026

== Americas ==
Country	Formal relations began on	Notes
Argentina	26 April 1995	See Andorra–Argentina relations
Canada	15 November 1995	Andorra is accredited to Canada from its embassy based in New York City.; Canada is accredited to Andorra from its embassy in Madrid, Spain.
Chile	15 July 1996	See Andorra–Chile relations
Colombia	2 November 1995	See Andorra–Colombia relations: Colombia is accredited to Andorra from its embassy in Madrid, Spain.
Mexico	5 May 1995	See Andorra–Mexico relations: Andorra is accredited to Mexico from its embassy based in New York City.; Mexico is accredited to Andorra from its embassy in Madrid, Spain.
Peru	3 June 1997	See Andorra–Peru relations
United States	21 February 1995	See Andorra–United States relations The United States established diplomatic relations with Andorra on 21 February 1995. The then-Permanent Representative of Andorra to the United Nations, Carles Font-Rossell, was accredited as Andorra's first Ambassador to the United States as of 14 March 2008.: Andorra has an embassy based in New York City.; United States is accredited to Andorra from its embassy in Madrid, Spain.

== Asia ==
Country	Formal relations began on	Notes
Armenia	18 November 2003	Armenia is accredited to Andorra from its embassy in Paris, France and maintains an honorary consulate in Andorra la Vella.

== Europe ==
Country	Formal relations began on	Notes
European Union	5 April 1995	Main article: Andorra–European Union relations
Austria	20 March 1995	Andorra has an embassy in Vienna.; Austria is accredited to Andorra from its embassy in Madrid, Spain.
Belgium	15 December 1994	Andorra has an embassy in Brussels.; Belgium is accredited to Andorra from its embassy in Madrid, Spain and maintains an honorary consulate in Andorra la Vella.
France	3 June 1993	Main article: Andorra–France relations: Andorra has an embassy in Paris.; France has an embassy in Andorra la Vella.
Kosovo	14 September 2011	On 8 June 2011, Andorra became the 76th member state of the United Nations to recognise the independence of Kosovo.^{[a]} The Kosovo Minister of Foreign Affairs stated that the two countries would form diplomatic relations very shortly. Previously, in 2008, Andorra was hesitant to recognise the Republic of Kosovo's independence due to a possible precedent in the region and due to pressure from Spain. Andorra and Kosovo established diplomatic relations on 14 September 2011.
Portugal	22 December 1994	See Andorra–Portugal relations: Andorra has an embassy in Lisbon.; Portugal is accredited to Andorra from its embassy in Madrid, Spain and maintains an honorary consulate in Andorra la Vella.
Spain	3 June 1993	See Andorra–Spain relations: Andorra has an embassy in Madrid.; Spain has an embassy in Andorra la Vella.
Ukraine	19 August 1996	See Andorra–Ukraine relations
United Kingdom	9 March 1994	See Andorra–United Kingdom relations: The United Kingdom is not accredited to Andorra through an embassy; the UK develops relations through its Consulate General in Barcelona, Spain.; Both countries share common membership of the Council of Europe, European Court of Human Rights, the International Criminal Court, OSCE, the United Nations, and the World Health Organization. Bilaterally the two countries have a Double Taxation Convention.

== See also ==
- Andorra–European Union relations
- Andorra–France border
- Andorra–Spain border
- List of diplomatic missions in Andorra
- List of diplomatic missions of Andorra
