= Football in Andorra =

- Country: Andorra
- Governing body: Andorran Football Federation
- National team: men's national team

National competitions
- Copa Constitució; Andorran Supercup

Club competitions
- Primera Divisió; Segona Divisió

International competitions
- Champions League; Europa League; Europa Conference League; Super Cup; FIFA Club World Cup; FIFA World Cup (National Team); European Championship (National Team); UEFA Nations League (National Team)

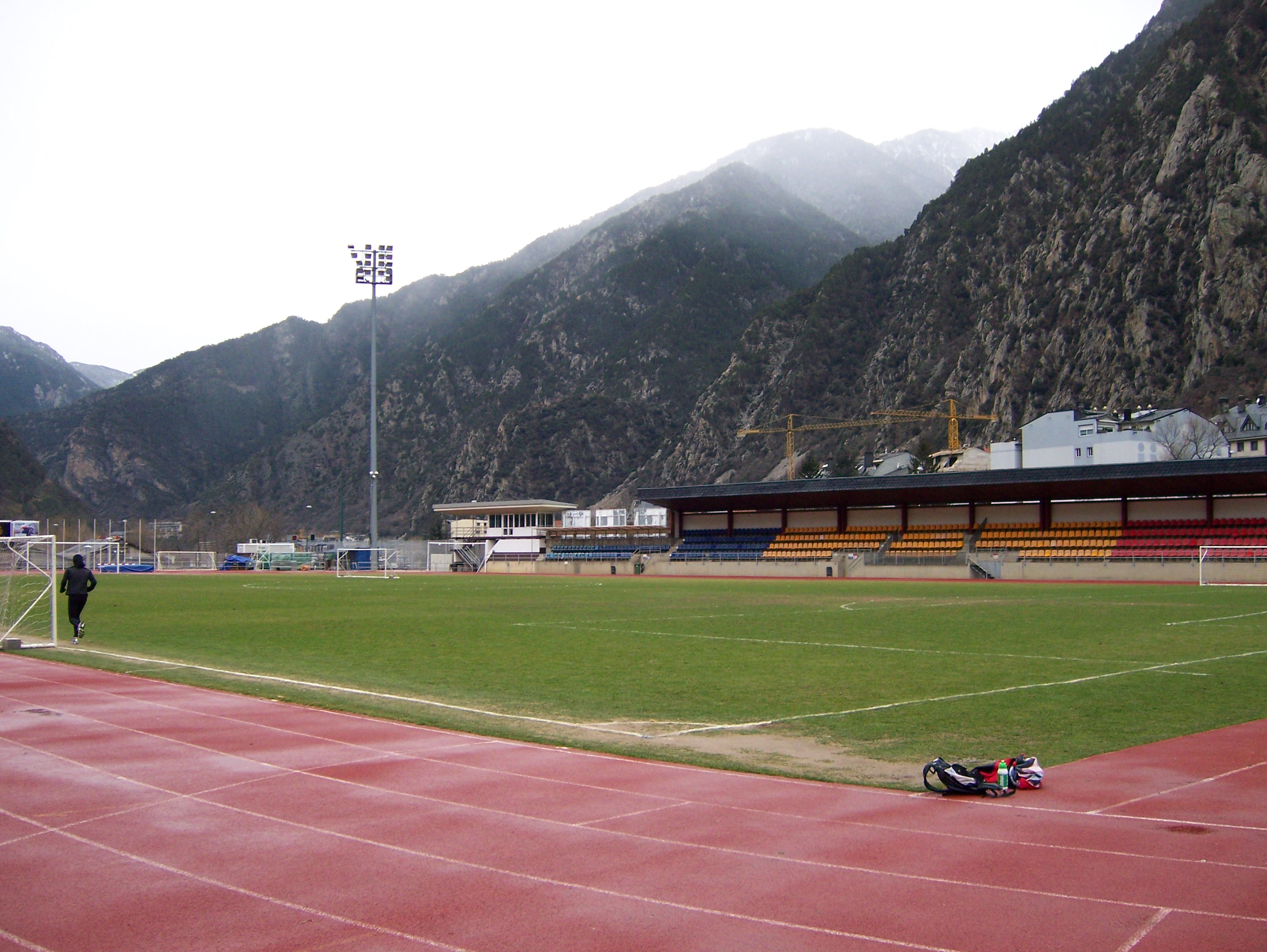
The Estadi Comunal d'Andorra la Vella in 2007.

Association football – commonly known as football (or soccer in the United States and Canada), (Catalan: Futbol associatiu) – is the most popular sport in Andorra. Prior to political developments in 1994, most football in the landlocked principality had been amateur with the notable exception of FC Andorra which has played in the Spanish football league system since 1948.

The Andorran Football Federation – the country's national football governing body – runs the Andorra national football team, as well as administering the nation's professional leagues the Andorran First and Andorran Second divisions. The national federation also organizes the Copa Constitució annual tournament and the one-off Andorran Supercup (Catalan: Supercopa Andorrana de Futbol).

== History ==
After the 1993 Andorran constitutional referendum resulted in independence for the state, the Andorran Football Federation (Catalan: Federació Andorrana de Futbol) was founded in 1994. The FAF was admitted to FIFA and UEFA in 1996, the same year the national team was organized. The country is represented in association football by the Andorra national football team. The men's national team played its first friendly at the Camp d'Esports d'Aixovall on 13 November 1996 losing to Estonia 1–6. The team gained its first competitive win in a European Championship qualifier on 11 October 2019, against Moldova. Since then the national team has recorded seven victories, one each against Albania, Belarus, Hungary, Liechtenstein, North Macedonia, Moldova and San Marino. They are one of the most penalized teams in Europe, having received more red and yellow cards in the WC 2006 Qualifiers than any other team. CE Principat was the first Andorran team to represent the nation in European Club Competitions appearing in the first qualifying round of the 1997–98, 1998–98, and 1999–2000 UEFA Cups.

== League system ==
Professional football in Andorra is organized by the national federation and currently consists of two professional leagues. The Lliga Nacional de Fútbol, also known as Primera Divisió (First Division) or as Lliga Multisegur Assegurances for sponsorship reasons., is the top football league. The Andorran Segona Divisió (Second Division), or Lliga UNIDA for sponsorship reasons, is the second highest football league in Andorra. The system has a hierarchical format with promotion and relegation between the leagues.

| Level | Leagues/Divisions |
|---|---|
| 1 | Primera Divisió; 10 clubs |
| | ↓↑ 1-2 clubs |
| 2 | Segona Divisió; 8 clubs (2 reserve teams) |

== FC Andorra ==
Futbol Club Andorra is a professional football club based in Encamp, Andorra, established in 1942. Although based in Andorra, they have competed in the Spanish football league system since 1948. They currently play in Segunda División, the second tier.

=== Attendances ===
The league attendances of FC Andorra:

| Season | Average | Highest |
|---|---|---|
| 2024–25 | 1,142 | 3,020 |
| 2023–24 | 2,057 | 3,020 |

== Football stadiums in Andorra ==
| Stadium | Capacity | City |
|---|---|---|
| Estadi de la FAF | 5,108 | Encamp |
| Estadi Nacional | 3,306 | Andorra la Vella |
| Estadi Comunal d'Andorra la Vella | 1,249 | Andorra la Vella |

== See also ==
- Football in Spain
- Football in Catalonia
