= Andorra–France relations =

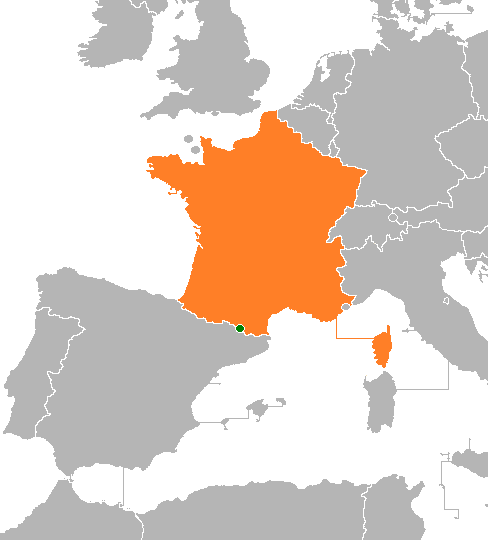
- Andorra: France

Diplomatic mission
- Embassy of Andorra, Paris: Embassy of France, Andorra la Vella

Andorra and France are members of the Council of Europe, Organisation internationale de la Francophonie and the United Nations. The two share a head of state, as the president of France is one of the co-princes of Andorra.

== History ==
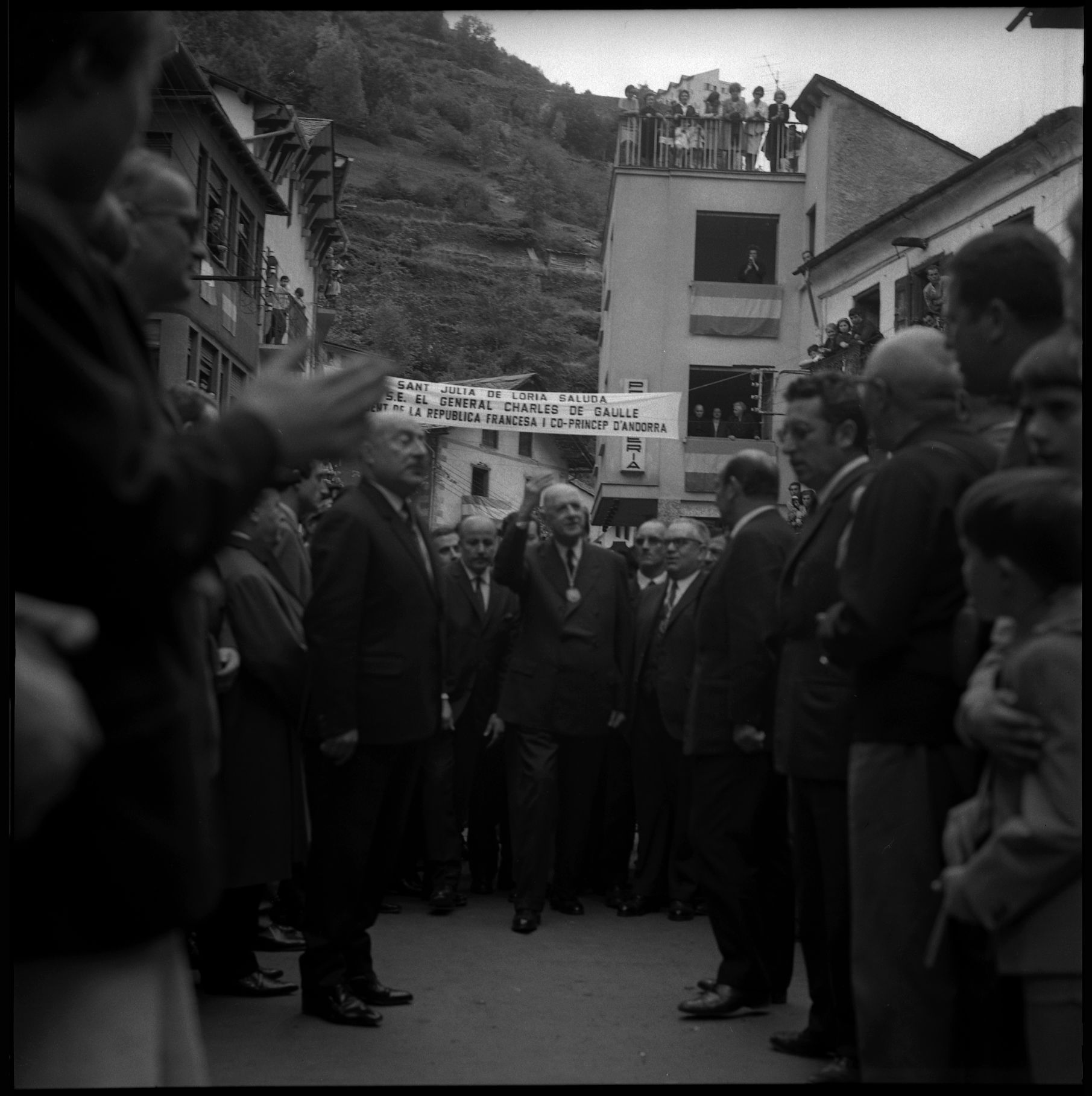
French President (and Co-Prince of Andorra) Charles de Gaulle visiting Andorra in October 1967.

Andorra and France have an unusual and long relationship. Andorra was created by Charlemagne as a buffer state between France and the Umayyad conquest of Hispania. In 1278, under terms of "pareage" agreement, Andorra adopted joint allegiance to a French and a Spanish prince after disputes between French heirs to the Urgel countship and the Spanish bishops of Urgell. For more than 700 years Andorra was ruled jointly by the leader of France and the bishop of Urgell. In 1607, a French royal edict established the French head-of-state and bishop of Urgell as co-princes. In 1936, during the Spanish Civil War, France sent troops to protect Andorra from the spillover of the civil war. During World War II, Andorra became an important smuggling route from Vichy France into neutral Spain.

Official diplomatic relations between Andorra and France were established after the signing of a joint Treaty of Good Neighborhood, Friendship and Cooperation between Andorra, France and Spain; after Andorra adopted a new constitution establishing them as a parliamentary democracy. The President of France acts as a co-Prince (along with the Spanish Bishop of Urgell) in Andorra. In 1993, France opened a resident embassy in Andorra la Vella. In October 1967, French President (and co-Prince) Charles de Gaulle paid a visit to Andorra. It was the first visit by a French President to the nation. President de Gaulle paid a second visit in 1969. Since then, there have been several bilateral visits between leaders of both nations.

French citizens are the second largest nationality to visit Andorra for tourism purposes (after Spaniards). French citizens are also the third-largest group of foreign residents in Andorra, with 3,000 French citizens living in Andorra.

== Bilateral agreements ==
Both nations have signed a few bilateral agreements such as Treaty of Good Neighbors, Friendship and Cooperation (1993); Agreements on the delimitation of the border and joint management of water (2012); Agreement on technical cooperation and mutual assistance in civil protection (2014); Agreement on cross-border police and customs cooperation (2014) and an Agreement on improving the viability of the roads RN 20, 230 and 22 between Tarascon-sur-Ariège and the border with Andorra (2017).

== Trade ==
France is Andorra's second largest trading partner (after Spain). In 2016, France provided 15% of Andorra's imports and received 15% of Andorra's exports. Andorra's main exports to France include tobacco and furniture while France's exports to Andorra consist of many of that nation's basic food products, electricity and fuel. Several French multinational companies operate in Andorra.

== Resident diplomatic missions ==
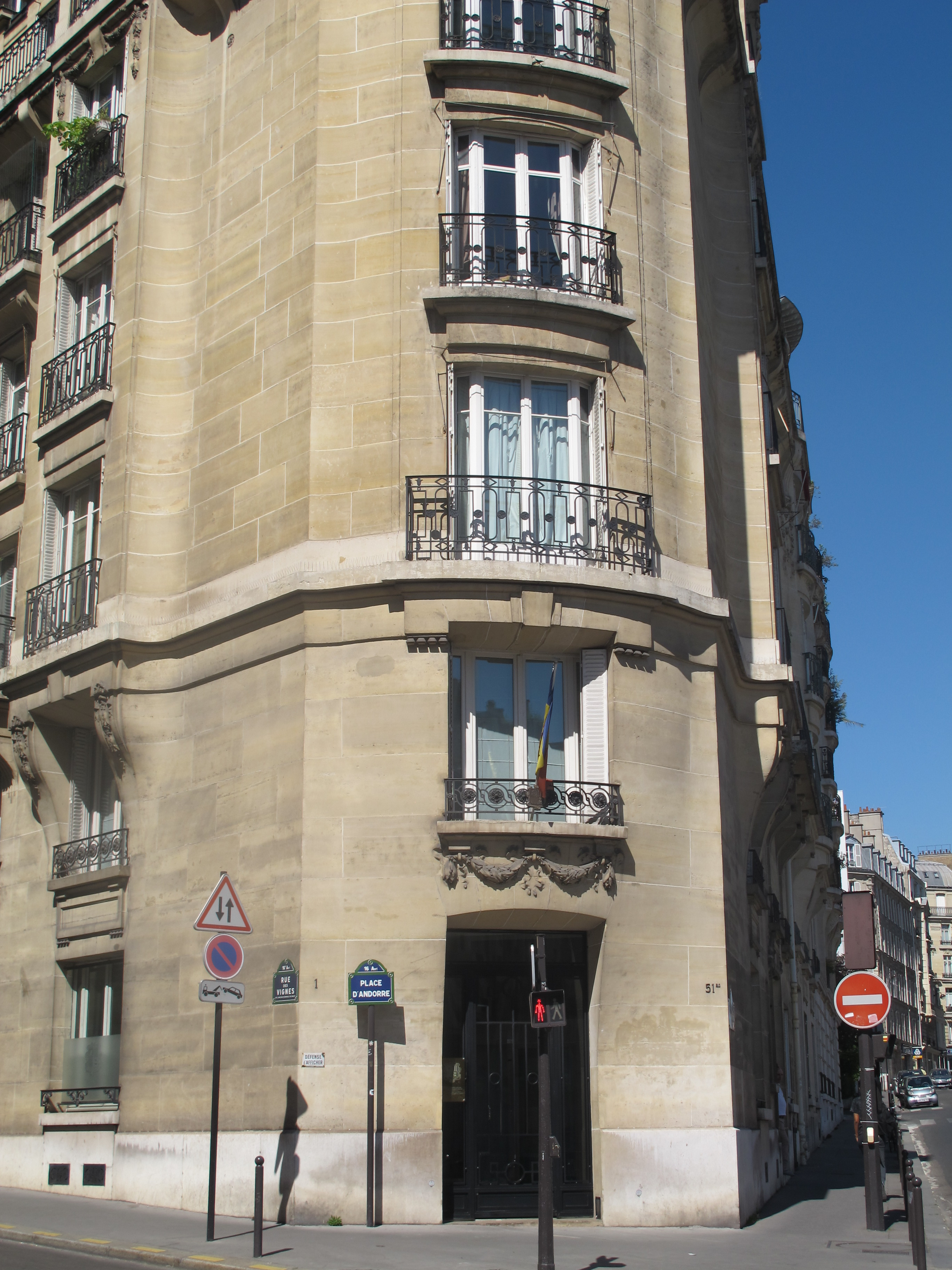
Embassy of Andorra in Paris

- Andorra has an embassy in Paris.
- France has an embassy in Andorra la Vella.

== See also ==
- Foreign relations of Andorra
- Foreign relations of France
- Andorra–France border
- Andorra–European Union relations
