= Andorra–Spain relations =

- Spain: Andorra

Diplomatic mission
- Embassy of Spain, Andorra la Vella: Embassy of Andorra, Madrid

Andorra and Spain are members of the Council of Europe, Organization of Ibero-American States and the United Nations.

== History ==
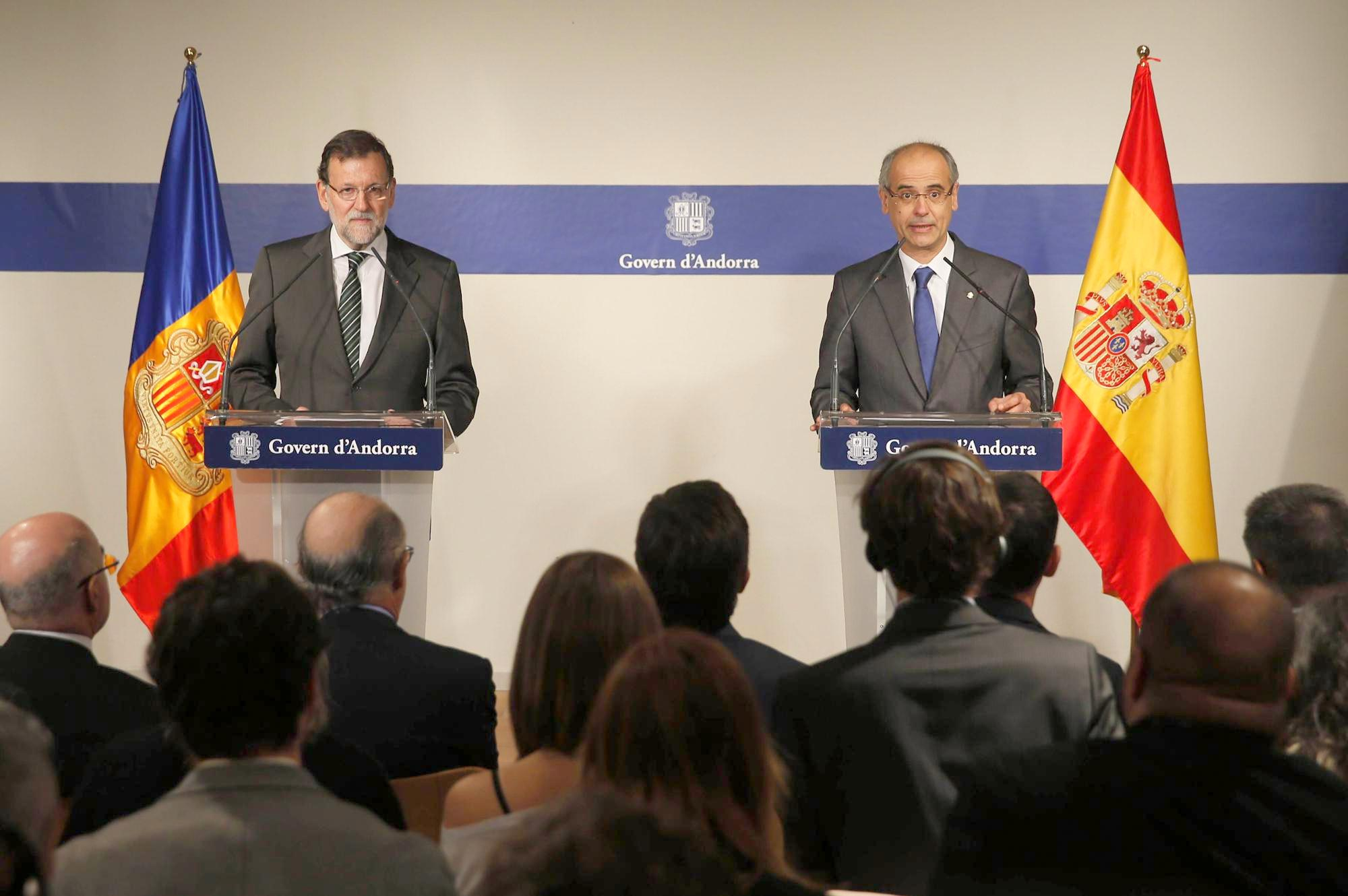
Spanish Prime Minister Mariano Rajoy and Andorran Prime Minister Antoni Martí at a press conference during Prime Minister Rajoy's visit to Andorra; January 2015.

Andorra and Spain have an unusual and long relationship. Andorra was created by Charlemagne as a buffer state between the Carolingian Empire and al-Andalus. In 1278, under terms of "pareage" agreement, Andorra adopted joint allegiance to a French and a Spanish prince after disputes between French heirs to the Urgel countship and the Spanish bishops of Urgell. For more than 700 years Andorra was ruled jointly by the leader of France and the bishop of Urgell. During the Spanish Civil War, Andorra received refugees from both sides of the Spanish conflict. During World War II, Andorra became an important smuggling route from Vichy France into Francoist Spain.

Official diplomatic relations between Andorra and Spain were established after the signing of a joint Treaty of Good Neighborhood, Friendship and Cooperation between Andorra, France and Spain; after Andorra adopted a new constitution establishing them as a parliamentary democracy. The bishop of Urgell acts as a co-prince of Andorra along with the president of France. In 1993, Spain opened a resident embassy in Andorra la Vella. In 2005, Andorra was admitted into the Organization of Ibero-American States and that year, Andorran Prime Minister Albert Pintat attended the Ibero-American Summit held in Salamanca, Spain. In January 2015, Spanish Prime Minister Mariano Rajoy became the first Spanish leader to ever visit Andorra. The visit was a clear example of the good state of bilateral relations. The progressive intensification of bilateral relations between Andorra and Spain progressed with the formal invitation, made in November 2016, by Andorran Present Antoni Martí for King Felipe VI of Spain to visit the Principality.

In July 2018, Andorra and Spain highlighted their "strong ties" on the 25th anniversary of the establishment of diplomatic relations. In March 2021, the King and Queen of Spain, Felipe VI and Letizia Ortiz, made the first state visit of a Spanish king to neighboring Andorra, something that had never happened before. The Andorran Head of Government, Xavier Espot Zamora, declared: "it is one more example, but a very significant one, of the excellent bilateral relations".

In April 2021, Spanish Prime Minister Pedro Sánchez paid a visit to Andorra to participate in the 27th Ibero-American Summit.

== Citizenship and tourism ==
Spaniards are the largest nationality to visit Andorra for touristic purposes. Spaniards are also the largest foreign residents in Andorra, with over 18,000 Spanish citizens living in Andorra.

== Bilateral agreements ==
Since 1993, both nations have signed several bilateral agreements such as a Treaty of Good Neighborhood, Friendship and Cooperation (1993); Agreement regarding the Statute of the Co-Prince Episcopal (1995); Agreement regarding the entry, circulation, residence and establishment of each nations citizens (2000); Agreement on Social Security (2002); Agreement on reciprocal recognition of hunting weapon authorizations and sports shooting (2005); Agreement in educational matters (2005); Agreement of Collaboration between the General Council of the Judiciary and the Superior Council of Justice (2006); Agreement for the exchange of information on tax matters (2010); Agreement on access to each nation's Universities (2010); Agreement on the transfer of waste (2011); Protocol of collaboration between the Spanish Attorney General of the State and the Andorran President of the Higher Council of Justice to establish a program of exchanges and visits by public prosecutors (2014); Agreement to avoid Double Taxation (2015); Agreement on International Road Transport (2015); Memorandum of understanding, friendship and general cooperation (2015); Agreement between the Spanish General Council of the Judiciary and the Andorran Superior Council of Justice (2015); Convention on combating crime and cooperation in security matters (2015); Memorandum of understanding between the AEMPS and the Ministry of Health of Andorra on Cooperation on medicines, health products and cosmetics (2017); Memorandum of understanding regarding the transfer of people diagnosed with high-risk infectious diseases for treatment in specialized medical centers in Spain (2017); Agreement on the exercise of paid professional activities by dependents of diplomatic, consular, administrative and technical personnel of diplomatic missions, consular offices and permanent representations before international organizations from one state to the other (2017) and a Memorandum of understanding in the field of cybersecurity (2017).

== Trade ==
In 2025, trade between Andorra and Spain totaled €1.2 billion Euros. Andorra's main exports to Spain include: tobacco and furniture. Spain exports to Andorra most of that nations basic food products and fuel. Spain is Andorra's largest trading partner. Several Spanish multinational companies operate in Andorra. A few Andorran banks operate in Spain.

== Resident diplomatic missions ==
- Andorra has an embassy in Madrid.
- Spain has an embassy in Andorra la Vella.
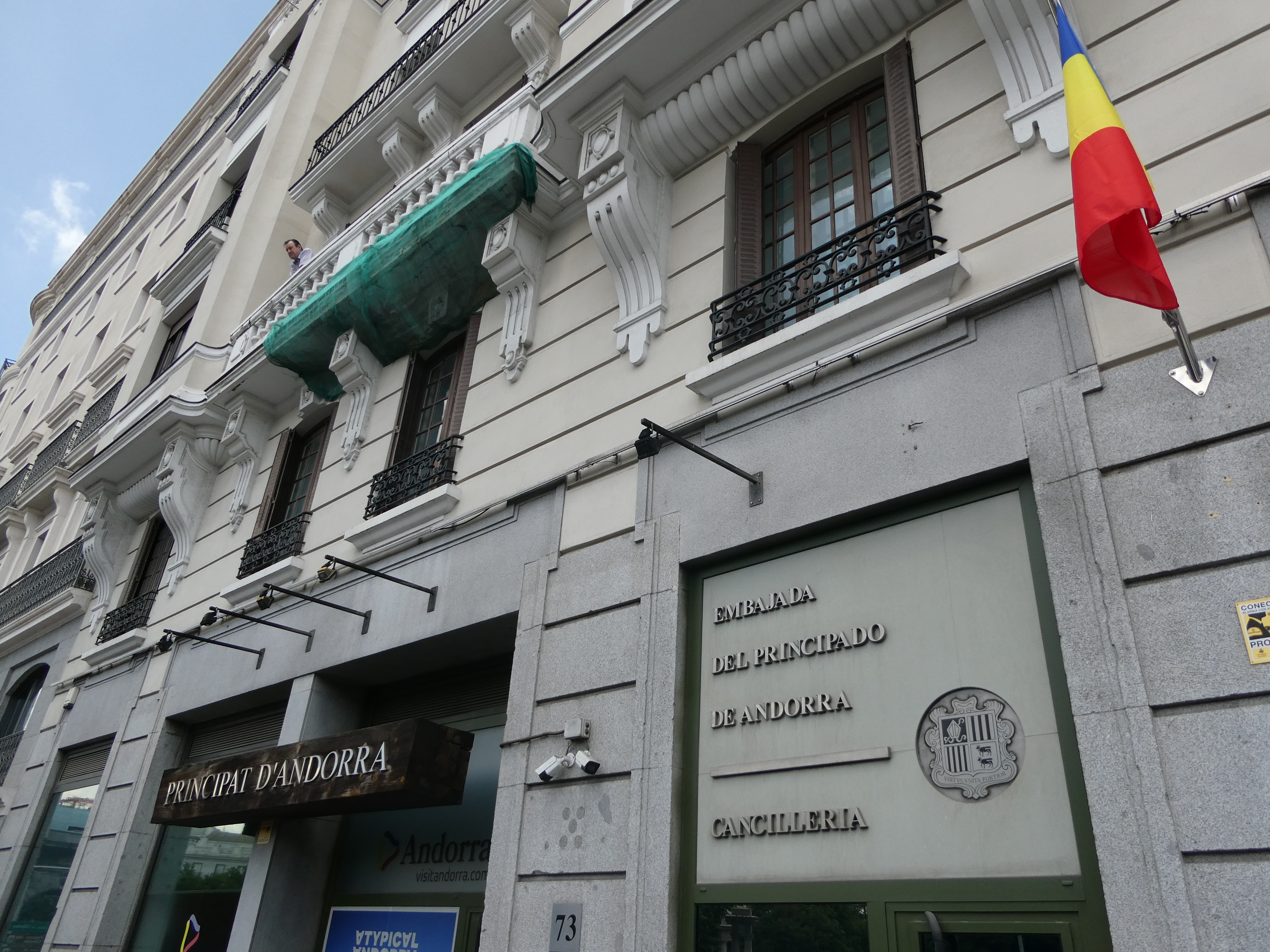
Embassy of Andorra in Madrid

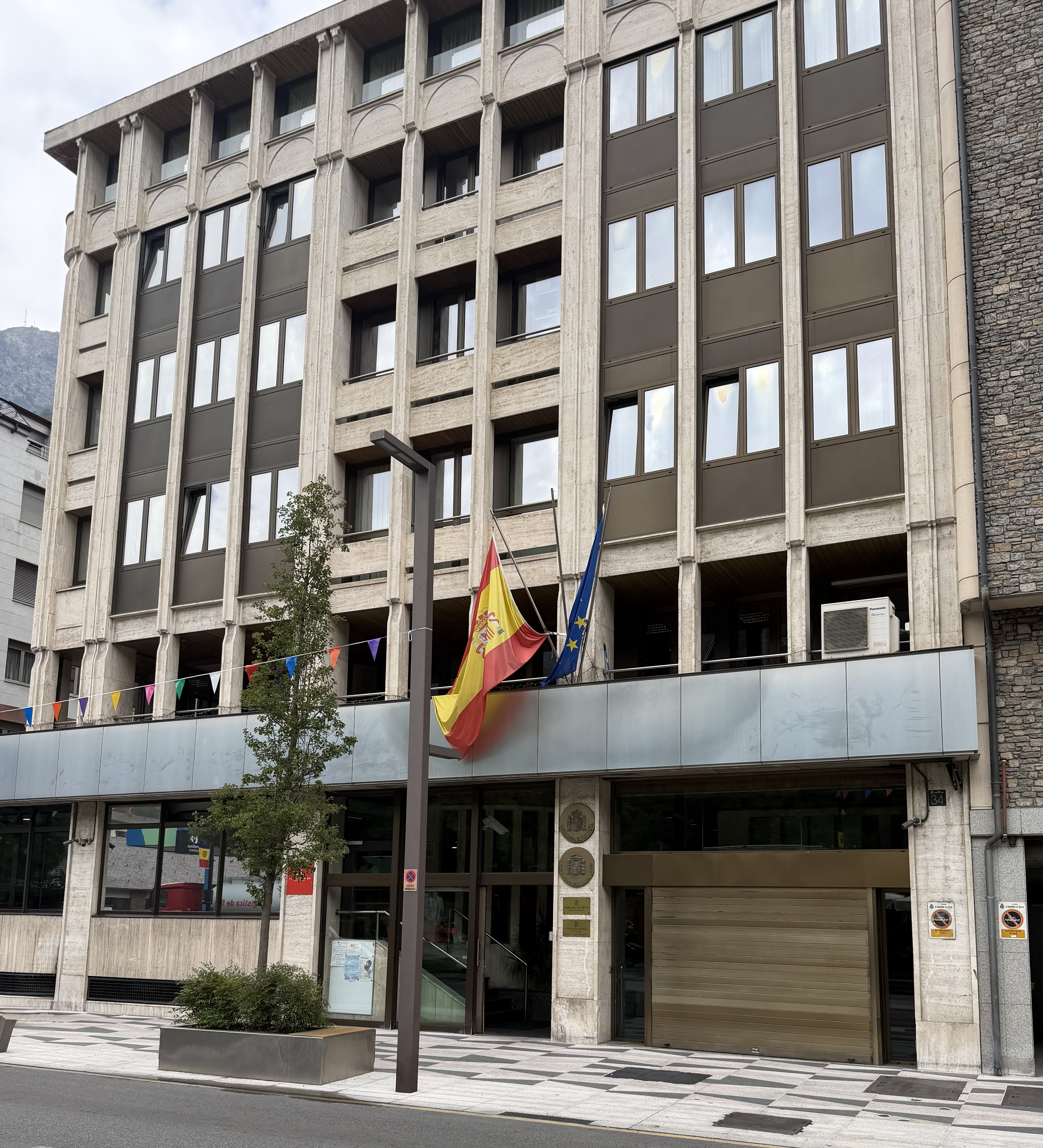
Embassy of Spain in Andorra la Vella

== See also ==
- Andorra–Spain border
- Andorra–European Union relations

== Bibliography ==
- Capdevila i Subirana, Joan (2009). Historia del deslinde de la frontera hispano-francesa. Del tratado de los Pirineos (1659) a los tratados de Bayona (1856-1868) (PDF). Madrid: Instituto Geográfico Nacional (España) – Centro Nacional de Información Geográfica. ISBN 978-84-416-1480-2.
