= Andorra–European Union relations =

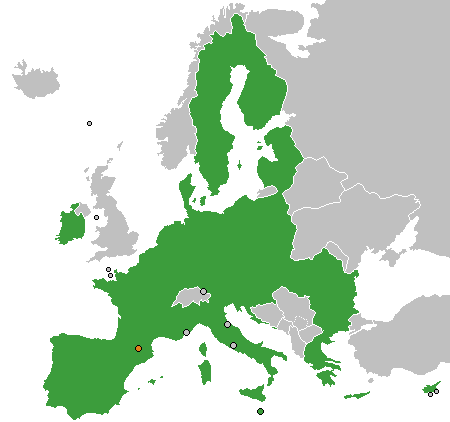
- European Union: Andorra

A customs union is the principal area of robust formal agreement between the Principality of Andorra and the European Union (EU). Andorra borders two EU member states: France and Spain.

== Customs Union ==
The "Agreement between the European Economic Community and the Principality of Andorra" (signed 28 June 1990, entered into force 1 July 1991) establishes a customs union with most favoured nation status between the Principality and the EU. Andorra is treated as an EU state where trade in manufactured goods is concerned, but not for agricultural produce.

Legally, there can be full customs checks on the EU side of the border, as Andorra has low VAT and other indirect taxes, such as those for alcohol, tobacco and petrol, from which visitors might benefit.

== Euro ==
Andorra has a monetary agreement with the EU allowing it to make the euro its official currency, and permitting it to issue euro coins as early as 1 July 2013. They planned to issue their first coins on 1 January 2014. However, EU approval was delayed until December 2013, and the first Andorran euro coins entered circulation in January 2015.

== Other agreements ==
Two other agreements were signed in 2003 and 2004. The first is a cooperation agreement covering the environment, communications, information, culture, transport, regional and cross-border co-operation and social issues. However this has seen few operational results so far. There is also a taxation of savings agreement which was signed following pressure from the EU on offshore financial centres to conform to EU standards.

There is an agreement signed in 2003 between France, Spain and Andorra on the movement and residence in Andorra of citizens of third States. It says that the three countries shall coordinate their visa requirements (in reality that Andorra follows the Schengen visa requirements) and that Andorra must accept entry only of those who have right of entry of Spain or France. Andorra is allowed to permit long stays for any person.

== Border controls ==
Andorra is landlocked, has no airport or seaport, but has several heliports. Visitors to the country can gain access only by road or helicopter by passing through the Schengen Area members France or Spain. Andorra maintains no border controls with either country. Border control points exist and border controls may be carried out in the other direction, but these are more focused on customs control (Andorra has considerably lower taxes than its neighbours, with for example a standard VAT rate of just 4.5%) and de facto no systematic border checks are conducted. Andorra does not have any visa requirements. Citizens of EU countries need either a national identity card or passport to enter Andorra, while anyone else requires a passport or equivalent. Schengen visas are accepted, but those travellers who need a visa to enter the Schengen Area need a multiple-entry visa to visit Andorra, because entering Andorra means leaving the Schengen Area, and re-entering France or Spain is considered a new entry into the Schengen Area. Andorran citizens do not receive a passport stamp when they enter and leave the Schengen Area.

There are only two official land border crossing points: La Seu d'Urgell in Spain and Pas de la Casa at the border to France. In addition, helicopters are allowed to go to airports with border control located in other countries, but not to other places outside Andorra. Flights usually go to the airports of Barcelona or Toulouse.

Andorra has stayed outside the Schengen Agreement. Andorran ambassador to Spain Jaume Gaytán stated in 2015 that he hoped that the Association Agreement then under negotiations with the EU would include provisions to make the states associate members of the Schengen Agreement, though the final text did not include such provisions. However, on 30 May 2024 the Council of the European Union authorised the opening of negotiations for a separate agreement between the European Union and Andorra in order to create a legal basis for the absence of border controls between the country and the Schengen Area. In September 2026, the Commission proposed to the Council to sign the finalized agreements on border controls with Andorra.

== Association Agreement ==
Countries that could join the European Union Current members Candidate countries Applicant / potential candidate countries Membership possible Membership not possible

In November 2012, after the Council of the European Union had called for an evaluation of the EU's relations with the sovereign European microstates of Andorra, Monaco and San Marino, which they described as "fragmented", the European Commission published a report outlining options for their further integration into the EU. Unlike Liechtenstein, which is a member of the European Economic Area (EEA) via the European Free Trade Association (EFTA) and the Schengen Agreement, relations with these three states are based on a collection of agreements covering specific issues. The report examined four alternatives to the current situation: 1) a Sectoral Approach with separate agreements with each state covering an entire policy area, 2) a comprehensive, multilateral Framework Association Agreement (FAA) with the three states, 3) EEA membership, and 4) EU membership. The Commission argued that the sectoral approach did not address the major issues and was still needlessly complicated, while EU membership was dismissed in the near future because "the EU institutions are currently not adapted to the accession of such small-sized countries." The remaining options, EEA membership and an FAA with the states, were found to be viable and were recommended by the Commission. In response, the Council requested that negotiations with the three microstates on further integration continue, and that a report be prepared by the end of 2013 detailing the implications of the two viable alternatives and recommendations on how to proceed.

As EEA membership is currently only open to EFTA or EU members, the consent of existing EFTA member states is required for the microstates to join the EEA without becoming members of the EU. In 2011, Jonas Gahr Støre, the then Foreign Minister of Norway which is an EFTA member state, said that EFTA/EEA membership for the microstates was not the appropriate mechanism for their integration into the internal market due to their different requirements from large countries such as Norway, and suggested that a simplified association would be better suited for them. Espen Barth Eide, Støre's successor, responded to the Commission's report in late 2012 by questioning whether the microstates have sufficient administrative capabilities to meet the obligations of EEA membership. However, he stated that Norway was open to the possibility of EFTA membership for the microstates if they decide to submit an application, and that the country had not made a final decision on the matter. Pascal Schafhauser, the Counsellor of the Liechtenstein Mission to the EU, said that Liechtenstein, another EFTA member state, was willing to discuss EEA membership for the microstates provided their joining did not impede the functioning of the organization. However, he suggested that the option direct membership in the EEA for the microstates, outside of both the EFTA and the EU, should be given consideration.

On 18 November 2013 the EU Commission published their report which concluded that "the participation of the small-sized countries in the EEA is not judged to be a viable option at present due to the political and institutional reasons", but that Association Agreements were a more feasible mechanism to integrate the microstates into the internal market, preferably via a single multilateral agreement with all three states (Andorra, Monaco & San Marino). In December 2014 the Council of the European Union approved negotiations being launched on such an agreement, and they began in March 2015. Negotiations had been planned to be concluded by 2020.

In December 2023, the European Commission announced the conclusion of negotiations on a new Association Agreement between the EU and Andorra and San Marino; negotiations with Monaco had been suspended in September 2023 due to disputes over financial regulation. The Commission formally put forward a proposal to the Council of the European Union in April 2024 to adopt decisions approving that the agreement be signed and concluded. In December 2025 the Council of the European Union determined that the agreement consisted of mixed competencies, and so would require approval in each EU member state's respective parliaments. In July 2026, following Bulgaria’s withdrawal of its veto, the Council of the EU authorized the signing of the association agreements with Andorra and San Marino, which organises their participation in the single market (including the financial sector if some conditions are fullfilled).

Andorra will hold a referendum to approve or reject the agreement. According to a public opinion poll in the second half of 2025, 35.2% viewed the agreement positively while 34% had a negative view.

The Association Agreement was signed on 19 October 2026.

== Potential accession of Andorra to the European Union ==
Deepening Andorra's relationship with the EU generally requires compliance with the EU's four freedoms (only goods is achieved) together with fiscal and financial sector reforms to EU standards (removing its tax haven reputation). The government has said that "for the time being" there is no need to join the EU. Minister of Foreign Affairs Gilbert Saboya Sunyé said in 2016 that the country did not wish to become an EU member state. The opposition Social Democratic Party is in favour.

== See also ==
- Enlargement of the eurozone
- Microstates and the European Union
- Andorra–France relations
- Andorra–Spain relations
