= Andorra–Ukraine relations =

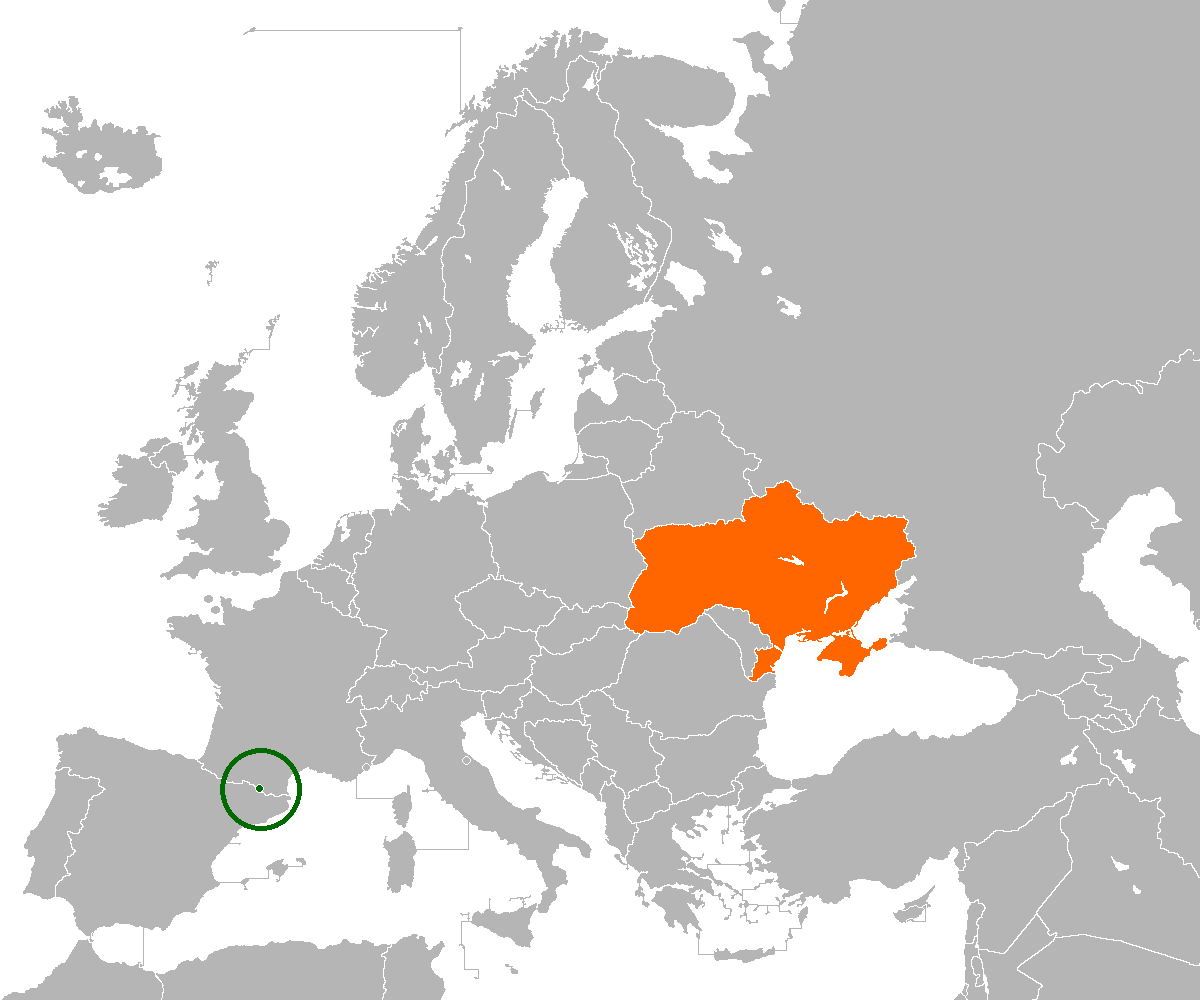
- Andorra: Ukraine

Andorra–Ukraine relations – a set of international bilateral relations between Ukraine and the Principality of Andorra, as well as cooperation between the two countries in international organizations and other international institutions. Ukraine's interests in Andorra are represented by the Embassy in Madrid (Spain) and an honorary consulate in Andorra (in force since September 2008, the Honorary Consul is Anthony Zorzano Riera).

== Relations ==
Relations between Ukraine and the Principality of Andorra are characterized by the absence of any problematic issues. The Andorran side identifies tourism and cultural cooperation as the main areas of cooperation with Ukraine. On the Ukrainian side, the main emphasis is on maintaining political contacts, promoting humanitarian issues, mutual support in international organizations, establishing a legal framework for bilateral relations and supporting the work of the Honorary Consulate of Ukraine in Andorra. The Andorran side continues to be particularly interested in cooperation on the adoption of Ukrainian children.

An important achievement in bilateral contacts was the interaction in international organizations, namely: the exchange of support for the candidacies of both countries to the relevant working bodies of multilateral organizations.

The issue of appointing the Honorary Consul of Ukraine in Andorra and starting the consulate has been on the agenda of bilateral relations for a long time. In 2008, all necessary procedural formalities were completed, and a consular patent and exequatur were issued to Andorra citizen Antonio Zorzano Riera. Ukraine is one of 7 countries that have their honorary consulates in Andorra.

From March 31 to April 2, 2011, a delegation of the Government of the Principality of Andorra led by the Minister of Tourism, Trade and Industry KB Mass visited Ukraine. This visit was the first visit by an Andorran government delegation since the establishment of diplomatic relations.

As a result of the visit, an Agreement between the Cabinet of Ministers of Ukraine and the Government of the Principality of Andorra on cooperation in the field of tourism was signed. This agreement became the first international intergovernmental document concluded between the parties.

== See also ==
- Foreign relations of Andorra
- Foreign relations of Ukraine
