= Andorra–United Kingdom relations =

- Andorra: United Kingdom

Andorra–United Kingdom relations refer to the diplomatic, historical, economic, and cultural ties between the Principality of Andorra and the United Kingdom of Great Britain and Northern Ireland. The two countries established diplomatic relations on 9 March 1994.

Both countries share common membership of the Council of Europe, European Court of Human Rights, the International Criminal Court, OSCE, the United Nations, and the World Health Organization. Bilaterally the two countries have a Double Taxation Convention.

== Diplomatic missions ==
- Andorra does not maintain an embassy in the United Kingdom.
- The United Kingdom is not accredited to Andorra through an embassy; the UK develops relations through its Consulate General in Barcelona, Spain.

== See also ==
- Foreign relations of Andorra
- Foreign relations of the United Kingdom
