= Gilbert Saboya Sunyé =

Andorran politician

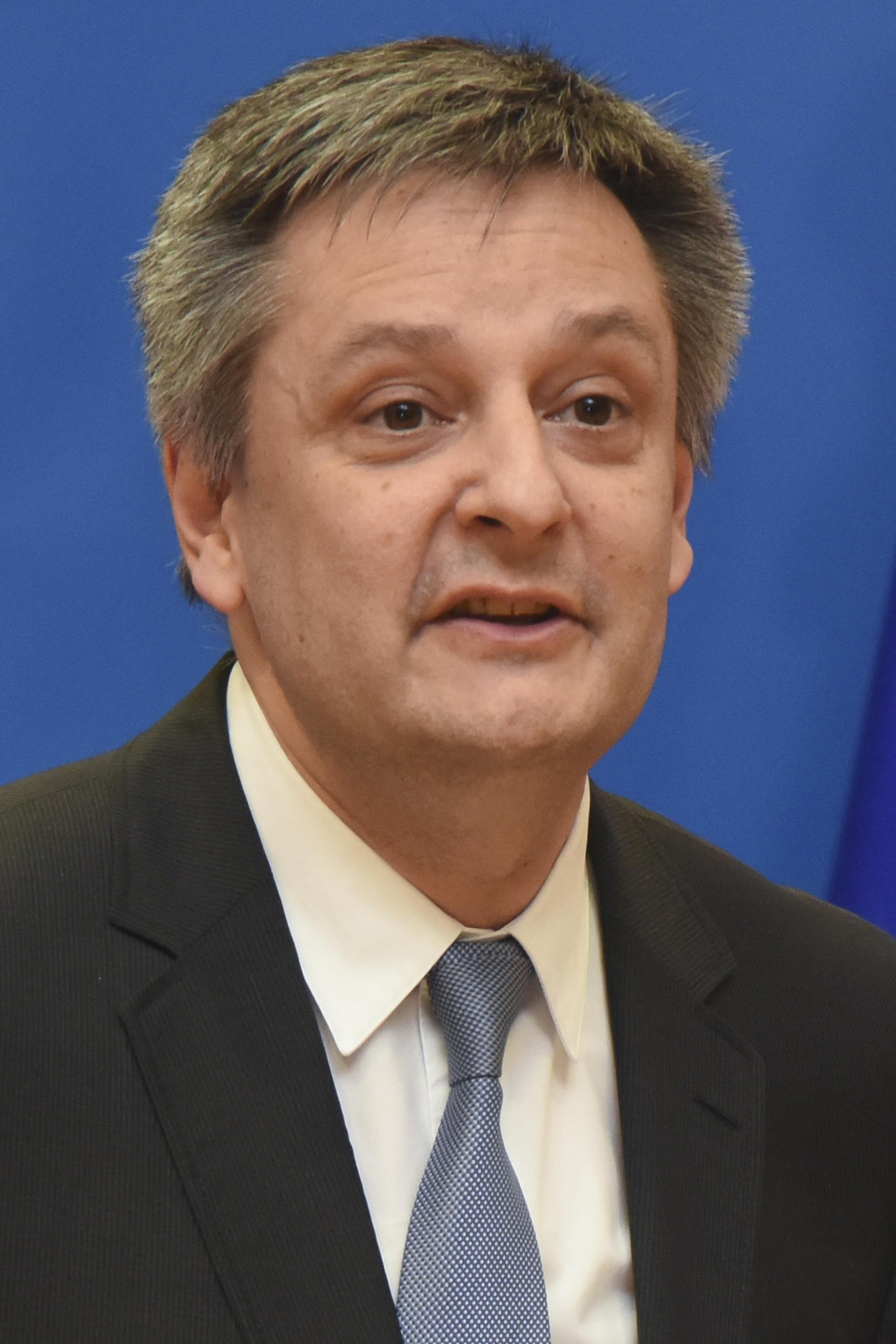
- Sunyé in 2015

Minister of Foreign Affairs
- In office 16 May 2011 – 17 July 2017
- Prime Minister: Antoni Martí
- Preceded by: Xavier Espot Miró
- Succeeded by: Maria Ubach i Font

Acting Prime Minister of Andorra
- In office 23 March 2015 – 1 April 2015
- Monarchs: Episcopal Co-prince: Joan Enric Vives Sicília; French Co-prince: François Hollande
- Preceded by: Antoni Martí
- Succeeded by: Antoni Martí

President of the Committee of Ministers of the Council of Europe
- In office 9 November 2012 – 16 May 2013
- Preceded by: Edmond Panariti
- Succeeded by: Eduard Nalbandyan

Personal details
- Born: 28 July 1966 (age 60) Sant Julià de Lòria, Andorra
- Party: Democrats for Andorra (2011–present)
- Education: Toulouse 1 University Capitole

Gilbert Saboya Sunyé (born 28 July 1966) is an Andorran economist and politician. He was the minister of Foreign Affairs to the Principality of Andorra from 2011 to 2017. Previously, he was the president of the Committee of Ministers of the Council of Europe from 9 November 2012 until 16 May 2013. From 23 March 2015 until 1 April 2015 he was acting prime minister of Andorra.

== Early life and education ==
Gilbert Saboya Sunyé was born 28 July 1966 in Sant Julià de Lòria, Andorra. He graduated from Toulouse 1 University Capitole.

== Political career ==
Before 2001, he was a member of the National Democratic Group. He was a member of the Democratic Party from 2001 until 2005. He joined the New Centre party in 2005, remaining until 2011. In 2011, he joined Democrats for Andorra.

On 16 May 2011, he was appointed the Minister of Foreign Affairs under Prime Minister Antoni Martí, succeeding Xavier Espot Miró. The representative for his term was Josep Maria Mauri on the Episcopal side, and Thierry Lataste from the French side. He was the President of the Committee of Ministers of the Council of Europe from 9 November 2012 until 16 May 2013, succeeding Edmond Panariti. He was followed in the role by Michael Spindelegger.

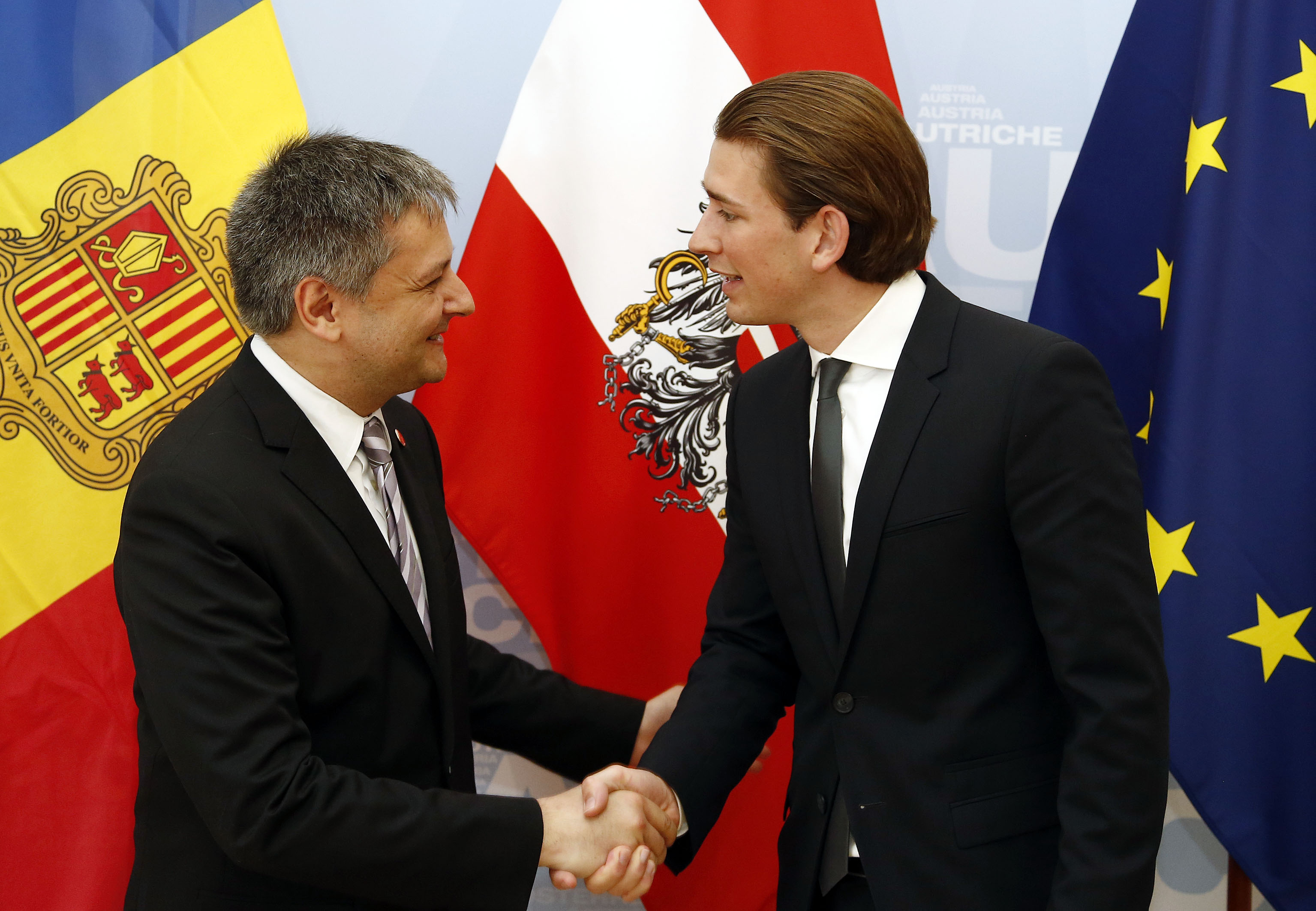
Sunye (left) with Sebastian Kurz in 2014

Remaining foreign minister, on 28 May 2014 Sunyé met with Chinese Foreign Minister Wang Yi in Beijing to discuss cooperation between the two countries. He was appointed the acting Prime Minister of Andorra on 23 March 2015, under Episcopal Co-prince Joan Enric Vives Sicília and French Co-prince François Hollande. He held the role until 1 April 2015, when it was again taken by his predecessor, Antoni Martí.

== See also ==
- List of current foreign ministers
- List of heads of government of Andorra
- List of foreign ministers in 2017
- Foreign relations of Andorra

Political offices
Preceded by Xavier Espot Miró	Foreign Minister of Andorra; 16 May 2011–17 July 2017	Succeeded by Maria Ubach Font
Preceded by Antoni Martí	Prime Minister of Andorra; Acting; 23 March 2015 – 1 April 2015	Succeeded by Antoni Martí
