= Ibero-American Summit =

Meeting for Spanish- and Portuguese-speaking countries

Countries in the Ibero-American Summit as of 2026: Member state (Americas) Member state (Europe) Associate observer Occasional participant or state interested in joining Request to join as observer (SADR)

The Ibero-American Summit, formally the Ibero-American Conference of Heads of State and Governments (Spanish: Cumbres Iberoamericanas de Jefes de Estado y de Gobierno, Portuguese: Cimeiras (or Cúpulas) Ibero-Americanas de Chefes de Estado e de Governo), is a meeting of the heads of government and state of the Spanish- and Portuguese-speaking nations of Europe and the Americas. Held every year from 1991, it has been held every two years since the 2014 summit in Veracruz. The permanent secretariat in preparation of the summits is the Ibero-American General Secretariat (SEGIB).

== Member states ==
The first summit, held in 1991 in Guadalajara, Mexico, was attended by the governments of Argentina, Bolivia, Brazil, Chile, Colombia, Costa Rica, Cuba, the Dominican Republic, Ecuador, El Salvador, Guatemala, Honduras, Mexico, Nicaragua, Panama, Paraguay, Peru, Portugal, Spain, Uruguay and Venezuela. Andorra joined in 2004. Puerto Rico has participated on occasion, but as it is not a sovereign country it is not allowed to fully join the summits. Belize and East Timor have expressed their interest in joining the summits, although they have not been allowed to join for the moment.

Following a proposal made by the Colombian President Gustavo Petro, Sahrawi diplomat Mohamed Azrouk said that Sahrawi Arab Democratic Republic will submit a request to join the Ibero-American Summit as an observer member.

== Observers ==
The Consensus of San Salvador, adopted at the 17th summit in 2007, created two observer categories: associate observers, for states with linguistic and cultural affinities with Ibero-America, and consultative observers, for intergovernmental organisations. Admission to either category requires the unanimous agreement of the member states.

The associate observers are Italy and Belgium (approved in 2009), the Philippines, the Netherlands, Morocco and France (2010), Haiti (2012), Japan (2013), South Korea (2016), and Germany, Hungary and Luxembourg (2021). The consultative observers include ECLAC, the OECD, UNICEF and UN Women.

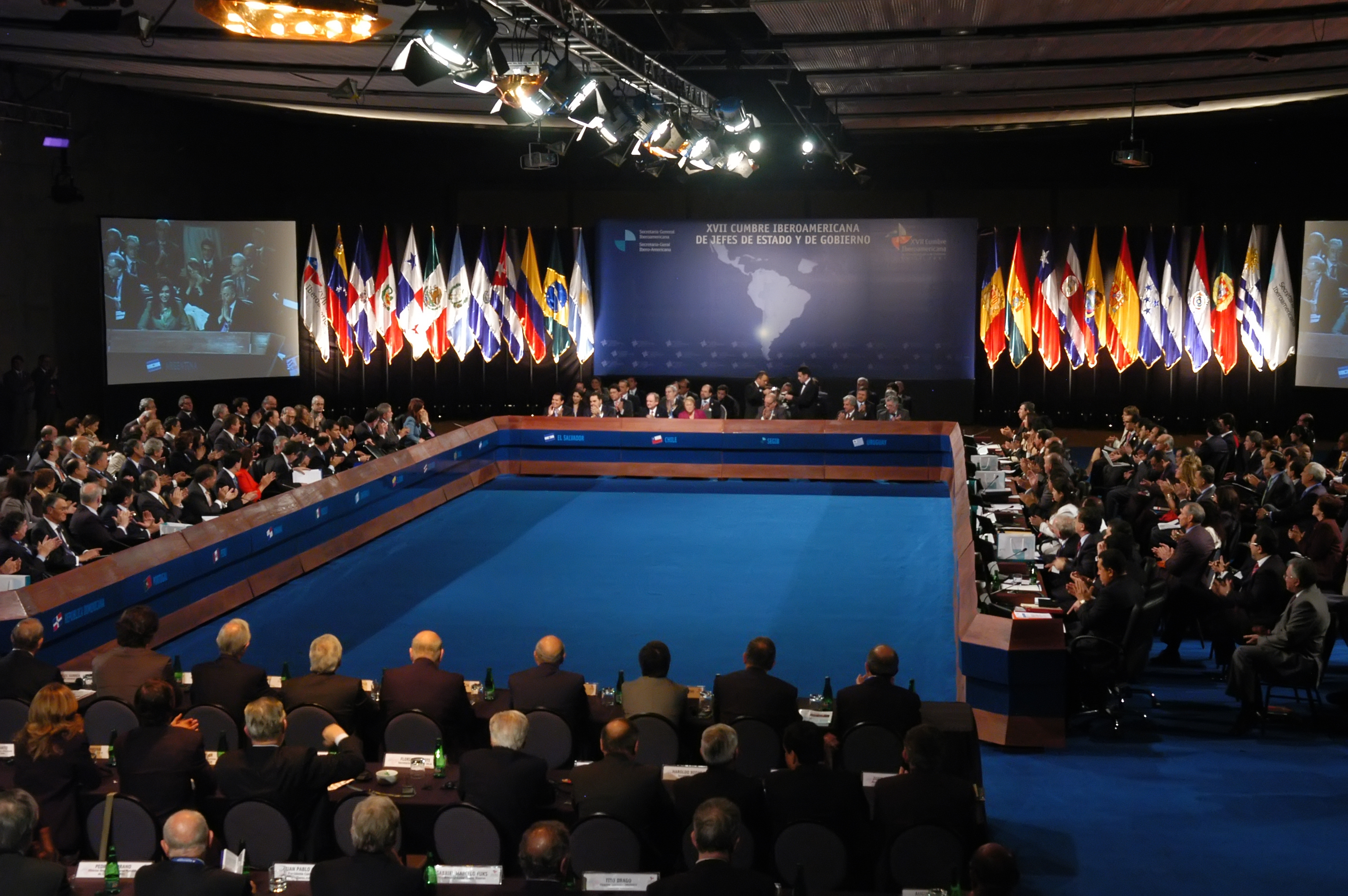
Ibero-American Summit, November 2007, Santiago, Chile.

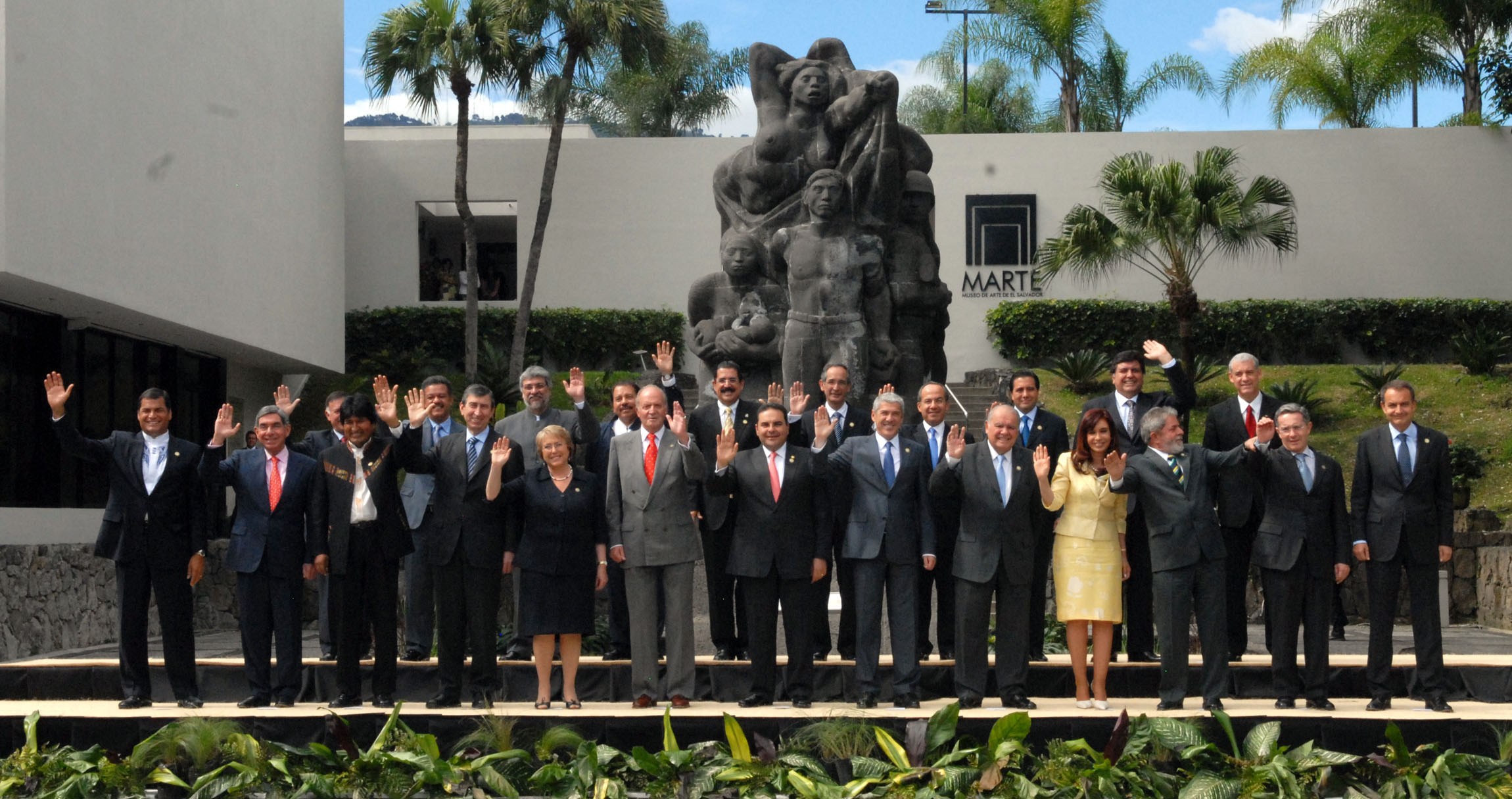
Ibero-American Summit, 2008 San Salvador, El Salvador.

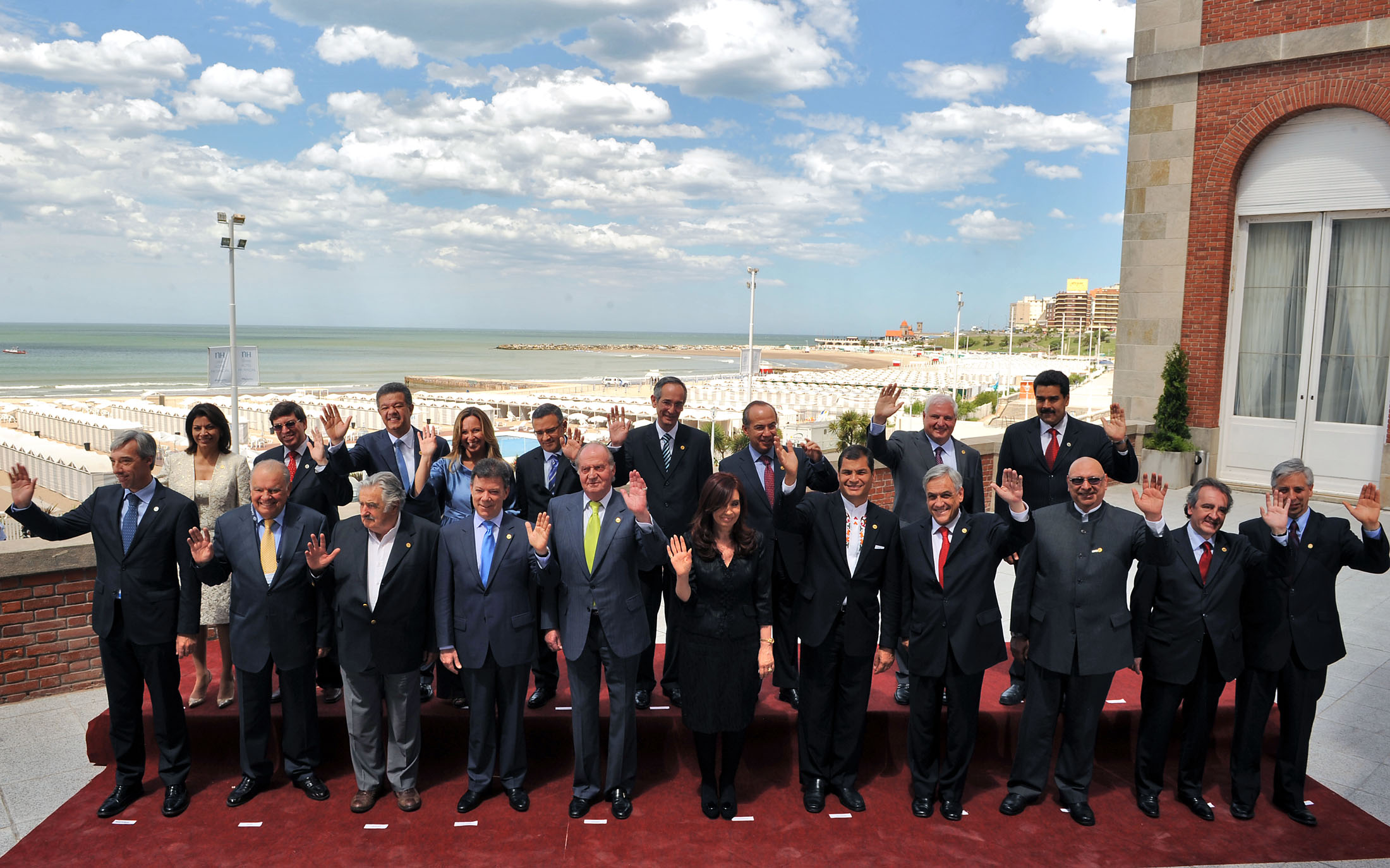
Mar del Plata Summit, December 2010

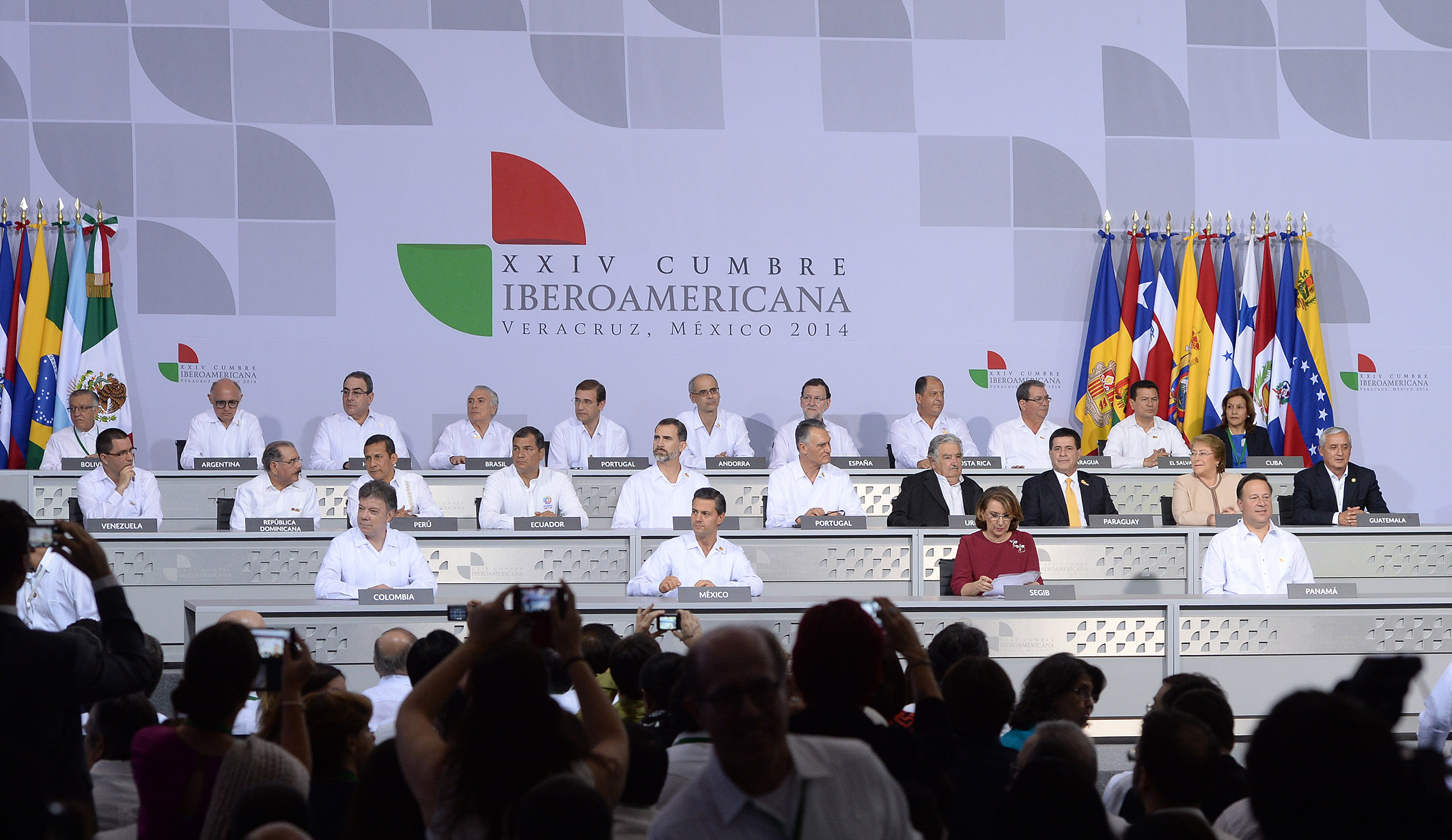
Ibero-American Summit, 2014 Veracruz, Mexico.

== Summits ==
| Summit | City | Country | Dates |
|---|---|---|---|
| 1st | Guadalajara | Mexico | July 18–July 19, 1991 |
| 2nd | Madrid | Spain | July 23–July 24, 1992 |
| 3rd | Salvador | Brazil | July 15–July 16, 1993 |
| 4th | Cartagena | Colombia | June 14–June 15, 1994 |
| 5th | San Carlos de Bariloche | Argentina | October 16–October 17, 1995 |
| 6th | Santiago and Viña del Mar | Chile | November 13–November 14, 1996 |
| 7th | Isla Margarita | Venezuela | November 8–November 9, 1997 |
| 8th | Porto | Portugal | October 17–October 18, 1998 |
| 9th | Havana | Cuba | November 15–November 16, 1999 |
| 10th | Panama City | Panama | November 17–November 18, 2000 |
| 11th | Lima | Peru | November 17–November 18, 2001 |
| 12th | Bávaro | Dominican Republic | November 15–November 16, 2002 |
| 13th | Santa Cruz de la Sierra | Bolivia | November 14–November 15, 2003 |
| 14th | San José | Costa Rica | November 18–November 20, 2004 |
| 15th | Salamanca | Spain | October 14–October 15, 2005 |
| 16th | Montevideo | Uruguay | November 3–November 5, 2006 |
| 17th | Santiago | Chile | November 8–November 10, 2007 |
| 18th | San Salvador | El Salvador | October 29–October 31, 2008 |
| 19th | Estoril | Portugal | November 30–December 1, 2009 |
| 20th | Mar del Plata | Argentina | December 3–December 4, 2010 |
| 21st | Asunción | Paraguay | October 28–October 29, 2011 |
| 22nd | Cádiz | Spain | November 16–November 18, 2012 |
| 23rd | Panama City | Panama | October 16–October 18, 2013 |
| 24th | Veracruz | Mexico | December 8–December 9, 2014 |
| 25th | Cartagena de Indias | Colombia | October 28–October 29, 2016 |
| 26th | Antigua | Guatemala | November 15–November 16, 2018 |
| 27th | Soldeu | Andorra | April 21, 2021 (semi-virtual; postponed from November 2020 due to the COVID-19 pandemic) |
| 28th | Santo Domingo | Dominican Republic | March 24–March 25, 2023 |
| 29th | Cuenca | Ecuador | November 14–November 15, 2024 |
| 30th | Madrid | Spain | November 4–November 5, 2026 |

== See also ==
- Community of Portuguese Language Countries
- Ibero-America
- Latin American integration
- Organization of Ibero-American States
- Rio Group
- ¿Por qué no te callas?

== Bibliography ==
- (1992) Primera Cumbre Iberoamericana, Guadalajara, México, 1991: Discursos, Declaración de Guadalajara y documentos. Mexico: Fondo de Cultura Económica. ISBN 968-16-3735-6
