= 1993 Andorran constitutional referendum =

- 14 March 1993
- Do you vote in favour of the draft Constitution of the Principality of Andorra, prepared in consultation with the services of the co-princes and adopted by the General Council in an extraordinary session on February 2, 1993?

Results
Choice	Votes	%
Yes	4,903	74.19%
No	1,706	25.81%
Valid votes	6,609	95.64%
Invalid or blank votes	301	4.36%
Total votes	6,910	100.00%
Registered voters/turnout	9,123	75.74%

A constitutional referendum was held in Andorra on 14 March 1993. Drafted by the Co-Princes and the General Council, the new constitution was approved by 74.2% of voters, with a 76% turnout. The first elections under the new constitution were held later in the year.

== Background ==
Historically, Andorra had been a principality led by the Co-Princes, the Catholic Bishop of Urgell and the King of France (later replaced by the President of France). The principality had no written constitution stating what prerogatives they had in law and the population had been asking for greater democratic rights. Andorra applied to join the Council of Europe in 1982. The council reported in 1990 that Andorra needed a written constitution to affirm the rights of citizens and recommended several reforms. The Co-Princes and General Council of the Valleys discussed this in 1991 and came up with a draft constitution based upon the European Convention on Human Rights to be put to the vote in a referendum. During the campaign, no Andorran political party opposed adoption with the opposition being a small number of politicians acting in a personal capacity.

== Results ==
Choice	Votes	%
For	4,903	74.19
Against	1,706	25.81
Total	6,609	100.00
Valid votes	6,609	95.64
Invalid/blank votes	301	4.36
Total votes	6,910	100.00
Registered voters/turnout	9,123	75.74
Source: Direct Democracy

== Aftermath ==
Following the approval of the constitution in the referendum, it came into force and the first Andorran parliamentary election was held later in 1993. The new constitution also had the effect of abolishing the Co-Prince's traditional mediaeval-era compensation of $460 to the French President in odd-numbered years, and $12, six hams, six cheeses, and six live chickens to the Bishop of Urgell in even-numbered years. This was replaced with a nominal, undisclosed flat payment. In 1994, the Council of Europe recommended acceptance of Andorra's membership application as a result of the referendum.
