= Geography of Andorra =

- Continent: Europe
- Region: Southwest Europe
- Coordinates: 42°30′N 1°30′E
- Area
  - Total: 468 km^{2} (181 sq mi)
- Coastline: 0 km (0 mi)
- Highest point: Coma Pedrosa, 2,946 m
- Lowest point: Riu Runer, 840 m
- Longest river: Gran Valira
- Largest lake: Lake Juclar
- Climate: temperate

Andorra is a small, landlocked country in southwestern Europe, located in the eastern Pyrenees mountain range and bordered by Spain and France. With an area of 468 km², it is the sixth smallest country in Europe and also the largest of the European microstates.

Andorra consists predominantly of rugged mountains, the highest being the Coma Pedrosa at 2,942 metres (9,652 ft), and the average elevation of Andorra is 1,996 metres (6,549 ft). These are dissected by three narrow valleys in a Y shape that combine into one as the main stream, the Gran Valira river, leaves the country for Spain (at Andorra's lowest point of 840 m or 2,756 ft).

Andorra's climate is similar to that of its neighbours' temperate climates, but its higher elevation means there is, on average, more snow in winter, lower humidity, and it is slightly cooler in summer. There are, on average, 300 days per year of sunshine.

Phytogeographically, Andorra belongs to the Atlantic European province of the Circumboreal Region within the Boreal Kingdom. According to the WWF, the territory of Andorra belongs to the ecoregion of Pyrenees conifer and mixed forests.

Landslides and avalanches are the main natural hazards. There are frequent earthquakes below Richter magnitude 2. There is no historical record of any damaging earthquakes in Andorra, but the Andorran government has studied the possibility of a future one.

In Andorra forest cover is around 34% of the total land area, equivalent to 16,000 hectares (ha) of forest in 2020, which was unchanged from 1990. In 2020, naturally regenerating forest covered 16,000 hectares (ha) and planted forest covered 0 hectares (ha). Of the naturally regenerating forest 0% was reported to be primary forest (consisting of native tree species with no clearly visible indications of human activity) and around 0% of the forest area was found within protected areas.

== Mountains ==
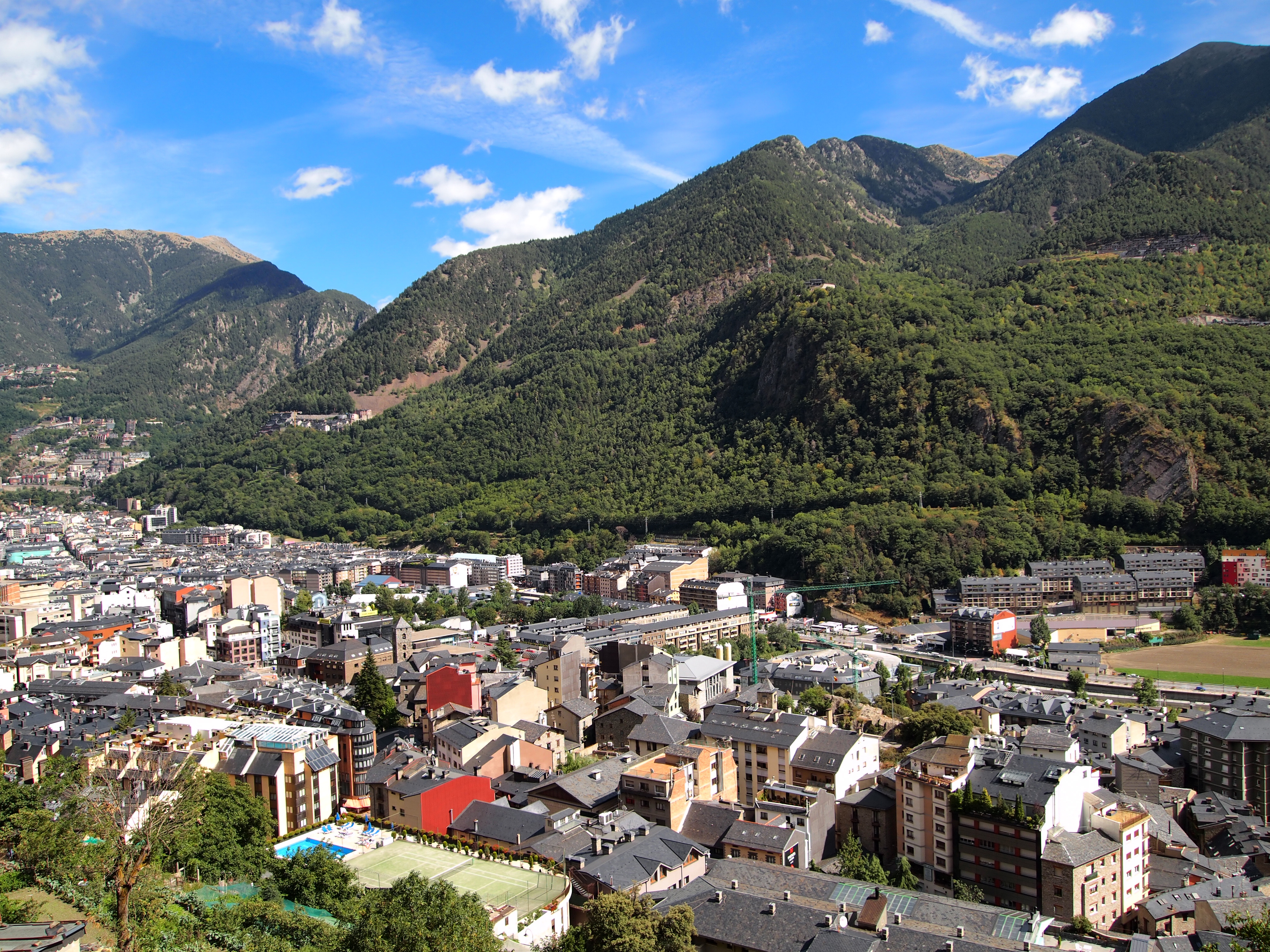
View of Andorra la Vella with mountains

All of Andorra is mountainous, and in total, there are 65 mountain peaks.

The highest mountain is Coma Pedrosa, which rises to 2,942 m (9,652 ft) in the northwest of Andorra near the French and Spanish borders.

Along the border with France, from west to east, the highest mountains are Pic de Médécourbe (2,914 m or 9,560 ft), which is the western tripoint international boundary of Andorra, France, and Spain, Pic de Cataperdis (2,805 m or 9,203 ft) and Pic de Tristaina (2,878 m or 9,442 ft), Pic de Font Blanca (2,903 m or 9,524 ft) in the northwest; Pic de Siguer (2,903 m or 9,524 ft), Pic de la Serrera (2,914 m or 9,560 ft) and Pic d'Anrodat (2,730 m or 8,957 ft) in the north; and Pic de Noé (2,737 m or 8,980 ft), Pic de la Cabaneta (2,818 m or 9,245 ft) and Roc Mélé (2,811 m or 9,222 ft) in the east.

Along the border with Spain, from west to east, the highest mountains are Pic de Médécourbe (2,914 m or 9,560 ft), Pic de Coma Pedrosa (2,942 m or 9,652 ft), Port de Cabús (2,301 m or 7,549 ft) and Pic dels Llacs (2,692 m or 8,832 ft) in the west; Pic Negre (2,665 m or 8,743 ft), Torre dels Soldats (2,761 m or 9,058 ft), and Pic de la Portelleta (2,905 m or 9,531 ft) in the south.

In the east, near where the borders of the two countries meet, lies Pic d’Envalira (2,825 m or 9,268 ft) and Pic dels Pessons (2,865 m or 9,400 ft). A lake, Estany de l'Estanyó, and a mountain, Pic de l’Estanyó (2,915 m or 9,564 ft) lie just east of El Serrat and are accessible only by hiking trail.

== Lakes and rivers ==
Andorra is drained almost entirely by a single basin whose main river, the Gran Valira, exits the country in the south near the Spain–Andorra road border crossing.

The Valira del Nord is the northwest tributary, flowing from near El Serrat through the settlements of Les Salines, Arans, La Cortinada, Sornàs, Ordino, and La Massana—where it meets the Tristaina River—and eventually through Les Escaldes where it meets the Valira d'Orient forming the Gran Valira.

The Valira d'Orient is the northeast tributary, flowing from near Grau Roig through Soldeu, Canillo, Encamp, and Les Escaldes where it meets the Madriu River and then the Valira del Nord, becoming the Gran Valira.

There are also several much smaller drainage basins that span Andorra's borders with France and Spain. The most notable of these is the Pic de Maià basin whose main river, the Sant Josep, flows easterly out of the country into France and is a tributary of the Ariège, which is in the Garonne basin (Atlantic).

Andorra has 172 lakes, of which the largest is Estanys de Juclar (23 hectares or 57 acres) near Pic de Noé in the north east.

== Climate ==
The climate in Andorra varies greatly with elevation. The valleys have an oceanic climate that is similar to the temperate climate of Andorra's neighbours, but because of the higher elevation, winters tend to be more severe, the humidity lower, and summers slightly cooler. Regions above the Alpine tree line at about 2,100–2,400 m (6,890–7,874 ft) have an alpine climate and alpine tundra. Snow completely covers the northern valleys for several months. There are, on average, 300 days per year of sunshine. Average daily peak insolation varies from 1150 W/m^{2} in June to 280 W/m^{2} in December.

The average annual temperature varies from 11 °C (52 °F) in Sant Julià de Lòria in the south, to 8 °C (46 °F) in La Massana in the centre, and to 2 °C (36 °F) in Arcalis in the north. The average daily high and low temperatures in Escaldes-Engordany are, respectively, 28 °C (82 °F) and 15 °C (59 °F) in July, and 11 °C (52 °F) and −2 °C (28 °F) in January.

Average annual precipitation is 1,071.9 mm (42.2 in) for the whole country, but it varies across the country, increasing with elevation and from south to north. The driest parish is Sant Julià de Lòria (800 mm or 31.5 in per year) in the south, and the wettest is Canillo (1,100 mm or 43.3 in per year) in the north. Annual precipitation can exceed 1,220 mm (48 in) the highest mountainous areas. The driest months tend to be January and February, and the wettest, May, June, and November. During the summer months, there are very few rainy days, but the rainfall can be very heavy because it is associated with thunderstorms.

Climate data for Andorra La Vella (Roc de Sant Pere), elevation: 1,075m (1971–2000, extremes 1934–present)
Month	Jan	Feb	Mar	Apr	May	Jun	Jul	Aug	Sep	Oct	Nov	Dec	Year
Record high °C (°F)	18.0 (64.4)	20.0 (68.0)	24.8 (76.6)	29.0 (84.2)	29.2 (84.6)	37.4 (99.3)	39.0 (102.2)	35.9 (96.6)	32.0 (89.6)	31.0 (87.8)	21.2 (70.2)	19.0 (66.2)	39.0 (102.2)
Mean daily maximum °C (°F)	6.9 (44.4)	8.9 (48.0)	11.7 (53.1)	13.3 (55.9)	17.6 (63.7)	21.9 (71.4)	26.2 (79.2)	25.4 (77.7)	21.4 (70.5)	16.0 (60.8)	10.7 (51.3)	7.5 (45.5)	15.6 (60.1)
Daily mean °C (°F)	2.2 (36.0)	3.5 (38.3)	5.8 (42.4)	7.5 (45.5)	11.5 (52.7)	15.4 (59.7)	18.8 (65.8)	18.5 (65.3)	14.9 (58.8)	10.3 (50.5)	5.7 (42.3)	3.0 (37.4)	9.8 (49.6)
Mean daily minimum °C (°F)	−2.5 (27.5)	−1.8 (28.8)	−0.2 (31.6)	1.7 (35.1)	5.3 (41.5)	8.8 (47.8)	11.4 (52.5)	11.4 (52.5)	8.5 (47.3)	4.7 (40.5)	0.6 (33.1)	−1.4 (29.5)	3.9 (39.0)
Record low °C (°F)	−15 (5)	−16 (3)	−11 (12)	−7 (19)	−2 (28)	0.0 (32.0)	3.0 (37.4)	2.0 (35.6)	0.0 (32.0)	−6 (21)	−10.5 (13.1)	−13 (9)	−19.5 (−3.1)
Average precipitation mm (inches)	53.1 (2.09)	37.9 (1.49)	40.5 (1.59)	71.2 (2.80)	89.8 (3.54)	84.2 (3.31)	60.7 (2.39)	85.6 (3.37)	80.9 (3.19)	72.4 (2.85)	68.4 (2.69)	67.9 (2.67)	812.3 (31.98)
Source 1: ACDA
Source 2: Meteo Climat (record highs and lows)

== Natural hazards ==
=== Avalanches ===
There is a risk of avalanches from mid winter to early summer. Avalanche control methods such as snow clearing by controlled blast charges, snow nets, snow fences, deflectors, rigid barriers, and snow compaction are used in Andorra to prevent dangerous avalanches.

==== 1996 Arinsal avalanche ====
The 1996 Arinsal avalanche was an exceptionally powerful powder-snow avalanche that followed several days of very heavy snowfalls and high winds. At 19:00 on 8 February 1996, the avalanche fell on the village of Arinsal destroying or severely damaging many cars and buildings and hotels including the crest hotel the rocky mountain bar and above apartments the asterics bar and little damage to three blocks of flats that were under construction by a Russian company and still are under construction; evacuation of the residents and tourists in the village had been completed 1½ hours before the avalanche, and consequently there were no deaths, but the material and economic damages were large. Afterwards, the government ordered the construction of a snow dam across the Arinsal valley to stop future avalanches. The Arinsal snow dam, which is 16 m (52.5 ft) high and 320 m (1,050 ft) wide, cost 52 million francs and used 115,000 m^{3} (150,414 cu yd) of soil and 11,000 m^{3} (14,387 cu yd) of rock.

==== 1970 Pas de la Casa avalanche ====
The 1970 Pas de la Casa avalanche was a powder-snow avalanche that happened after a severe snowstorm left 2 metres (6.56 ft) of new snow atop the existing snow pack on the mountain slopes above Pas de la Casa. The avalanche began at an elevation of 2,640 m (8,661 ft) on the upper slopes of the Pic d'Envalira (2,825 m or 9,268 ft), accelerated down the 35° slope and spilled over six bends of the old CG-2 road that winds its way down the mountain to the village of Pas de la Casa, which is at 2,100 m (6,890 ft). It then hit the village, damaging several buildings including a dispensary and killing a nurse. In 1970, Pas de la Casa had far fewer buildings than it does now, so the damage was relatively limited. In later years as development of the ski resort continued, plans for avalanche control measures were studied, but it was not until 1985 that strong protective features including 250 m (820 ft) of windbreaks and 500 m (1,640 ft) of snow fences were installed. The new CG-2 goes through the Envalira Tunnel, thus avoiding Pas de la Casa and the risk of avalanches.

=== Landslides ===
Landslides are a frequent occurrence in Andorra; they have tended to follow periods of heavy rainfall.

A landslide during the evening rush hour on 25 January 2008 deposited 4,000 m^{3} (5,232 cu yd) of loosely bound soil and rocks from the mountain slope above onto the main road CG-3 (Avinguda del Través de la Massana) between La Massana and Ordino, blocking it for three days, as well as completely covering an open-air car park and several parked cars. The only damage was to property, and nobody was injured, but the residents of a block of flats adjacent to the landslide were evacuated as the building was deemed unsafe and it remains vacant. The cause of the landslide was determined to be settlement of the earth due to inadequate ground reinforcement in the construction and excavation of the car park 30 years previously.

On 7 July 2009, a rock landslide fell 200 m (656 ft) onto the CG-3 main road between La Massana and Andorra La Vella, blocking the road near the entrance to the Pont Pla Tunnel for three hours. Protective nets on the mountain side caught most of the rockfall, but 4 m^{3} (5.23 cu yd) went over the nets and fell onto the road and pavement.

=== Earthquakes ===
The Pyrenees and Catalonia have frequent and sometimes destructive earthquakes — the largest in recorded history being the Catalan earthquake of 1428 with an estimated magnitude of IX on the MSK scale, equivalent to 6.0–6.5 on the Richter magnitude scale. However, earthquakes whose epicentres are inside Andorra tend to be smaller than magnitude 2. An earthquake of magnitude 4.2 on 5 October 1999 in nearby Bagnères-de-Luchon (France) was widely felt in Andorra, causing public alarm. The Andorran Government has studied the possibility of a damaging earthquake in Andorra.

== Extreme points ==
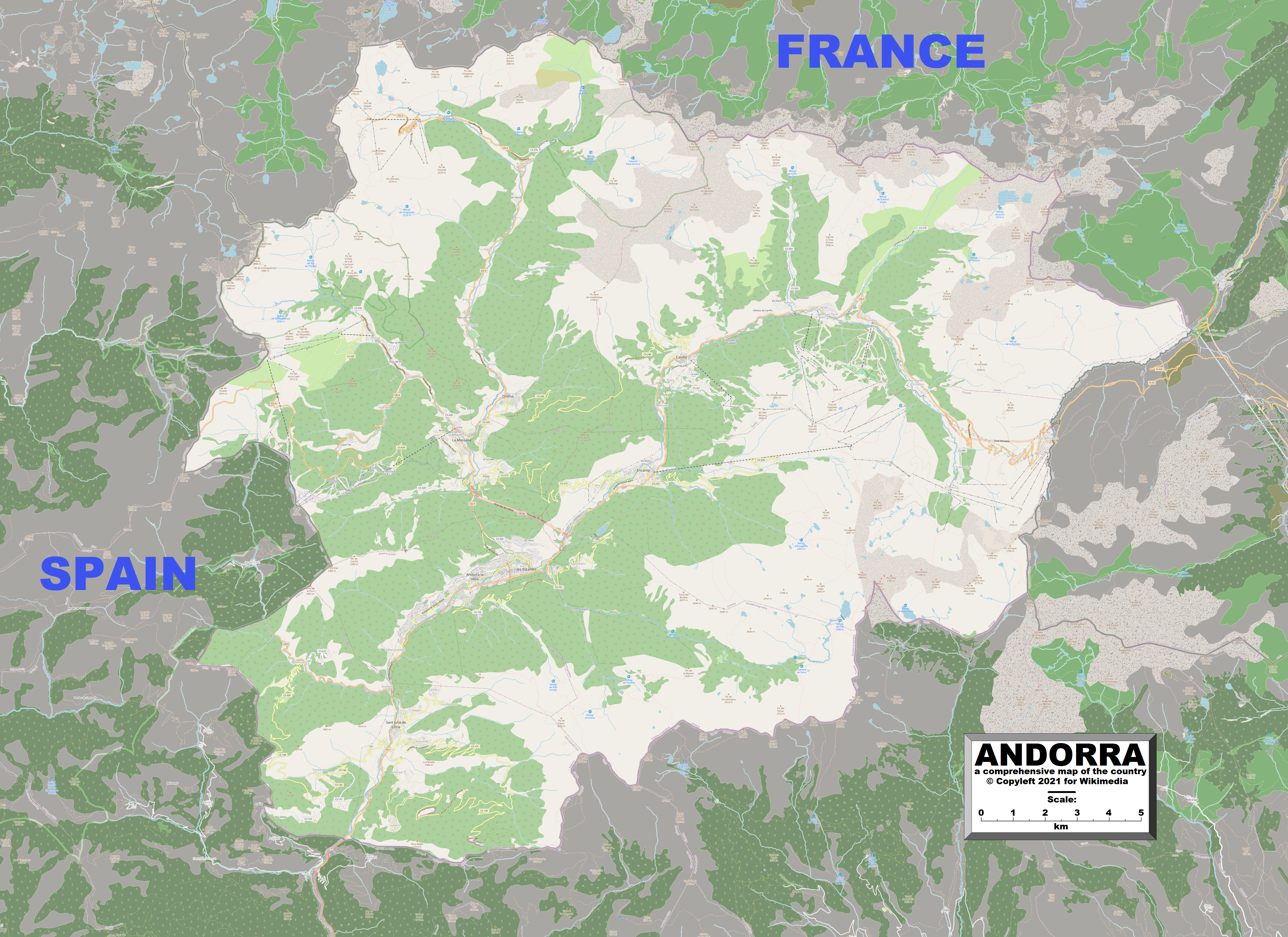
Enlargeable, detailed map of Andorra

Latitude and longitude

- North : Basers de Font Blanca (42°39′17″N 1°33′4″E)
- South : Conangle – Riu Runer (42°25′43″N 1°31′2″E)
- West : Coll de l'Aquell (42°29′11″N 1°24′32″E)
- East : Riu de la Palomera – Riu Arièja (42°34′26″N 1°47′10″E)

Elevation

- Maximum : Pic del Comapedrosa, 2,942 m (9,652.23 ft) (42°35′N 01°27′E)
- Minimum : Conflent del riu Runer, 840 m (2,755.91 ft) (42°26′N 01°29′E)

Centre

- Geographical centre : near Encamp, 42°32′30″N 01°35′51″E

== See also ==
- Wikimedia Atlas of Andorra
