= Lists of airports in Europe =

This page contains the lists of airports in Europe by country, grouped by region. The lists include both military air bases and civilian airports.

== Eastern Europe ==
- List of airports in Armenia
- List of airports in Azerbaijan
- List of airports in Belarus
- List of airports in Bulgaria
- List of airports in the Czech Republic
- List of airports in Georgia
- List of airports in Hungary
- List of airports in Poland
- List of airports in Republic of Moldova
- List of airports in Romania
- List of airports in Russian Federation
- List of airports in Slovakia
- List of airports in Ukraine

== Northern Europe ==
- List of airports in Denmark
- List of airports in Estonia
- List of airports in Finland
- List of airports in Iceland
- List of airports in Ireland
- List of airports in Latvia
- List of airports in Lithuania
- List of airports in Norway
- List of airports in Sweden
- List of airports in the United Kingdom (including British Crown dependencies)

== Southern Europe ==
- List of airports in Albania
- List of airports in Bosnia and Herzegovina
- List of airports in Croatia
- List of airports in Cyprus
- List of airports in Gibraltar
- List of airports in Greece
- List of airports in Italy
- List of airports in Malta
- List of airports in Montenegro
- List of airports in North Macedonia
- List of airports in Portugal
- List of airports in Serbia
- List of airports in Slovenia
- List of airports in Spain
- List of airports in Turkey

== Western Europe ==
- List of airports in Austria
- List of airports in Belgium
- List of airports in France
- List of airports in Germany
- List of airports in Luxembourg
- List of airports in Netherlands
- List of airports in Switzerland

== Countries without airports ==
The five European microstates have no airport within their boundaries, though San Marino does have a small airfield with a grass runway. Each has at least one heliport and all except Monaco are landlocked. The only heliport to have a Schengen border control is in Monaco. For Liechtenstein, San Marino and Vatican City only flights inside the Schengen Area are allowed, due to a lack of border controls. Andorra is more unregulated.

=== Andorra ===
Andorra has no airports for fixed-wing aircraft, but it has Andorra la Vella Heliport in the capital city of Andorra la Vella, as well as heliports in La Massana and Arinsal. The nearest airport is La Seu d'Urgell Airport in Spain, 10 kilometres (6.2 miles) south of the Andorran border, currently used for general aviation, but intended to be developed as a commercial airport, although the short runway limits it to small aircraft. The nearest airports with scheduled commercial service are Carcassonne Airport and Perpignan-Rivesaltes Airport in France, and Lleida-Alguaire Airport in Spain. The nearest major airports are Barcelona-El Prat Airport and Girona-Costa Brava Airport in Spain, and Toulouse-Blagnac Airport in France, which all have transfers to Andorra by bus. All these airports except La Seu d'Urgell need around three hours to reach by car.

=== Liechtenstein ===
Liechtenstein does not have an airport, but does have a heliport in the southern town of Balzers. The nearest international airports are St. Gallen-Altenrhein Airport in Switzerland and Friedrichshafen Airport in Germany, which have few scheduled flights. The nearest major airport is Zurich Airport in Switzerland, which has rail service to Buchs and Sargans. From these towns, it is possible to catch a Postal Bus or a train to Liechtenstein.

=== Monaco ===
Monaco has no airports, but does have Monaco Heliport in the Monégasque district of Fontvieille. The nearest airport is Nice Côte d'Azur Airport in France. The heliport has a Schengen border control, so it is possible to fly from e.g. London or Tunis, although this will take a few hours, and few helicopters have such range.

=== San Marino ===
San Marino does not have a commercial airport, but does have a small airfield in Torraccia with a 680-metre (2,230-foot) grass runway owned by the AeroClub San Marino. There is also a heliport in Borgo Maggiore. The nearest airport is Rimini's Federico Fellini Airport in Italy, with transfers available by bus to San Marino.

=== Vatican City ===
Vatican City has no airport and is too small to contain one; the Holy See has a land area of 0.44 km^{2} (0.17 sq mi), and a maximum width of 900 m (3,000 ft). However, it does have Vatican City Heliport in the western corner, which is used for visiting heads and officials of the city-state. The nearest airport is Rome Ciampino Airport in Italy.

== See also ==
- Lists of airports
- List of the busiest airports in Europe
- List of the busiest airports in the Baltic states
- List of the largest airports in the Nordic countries
- Wikipedia:WikiProject Aviation/Airline destination lists: Europe
