= Església de Sant Joan de Sispony =

Church in Sispony, Andorra

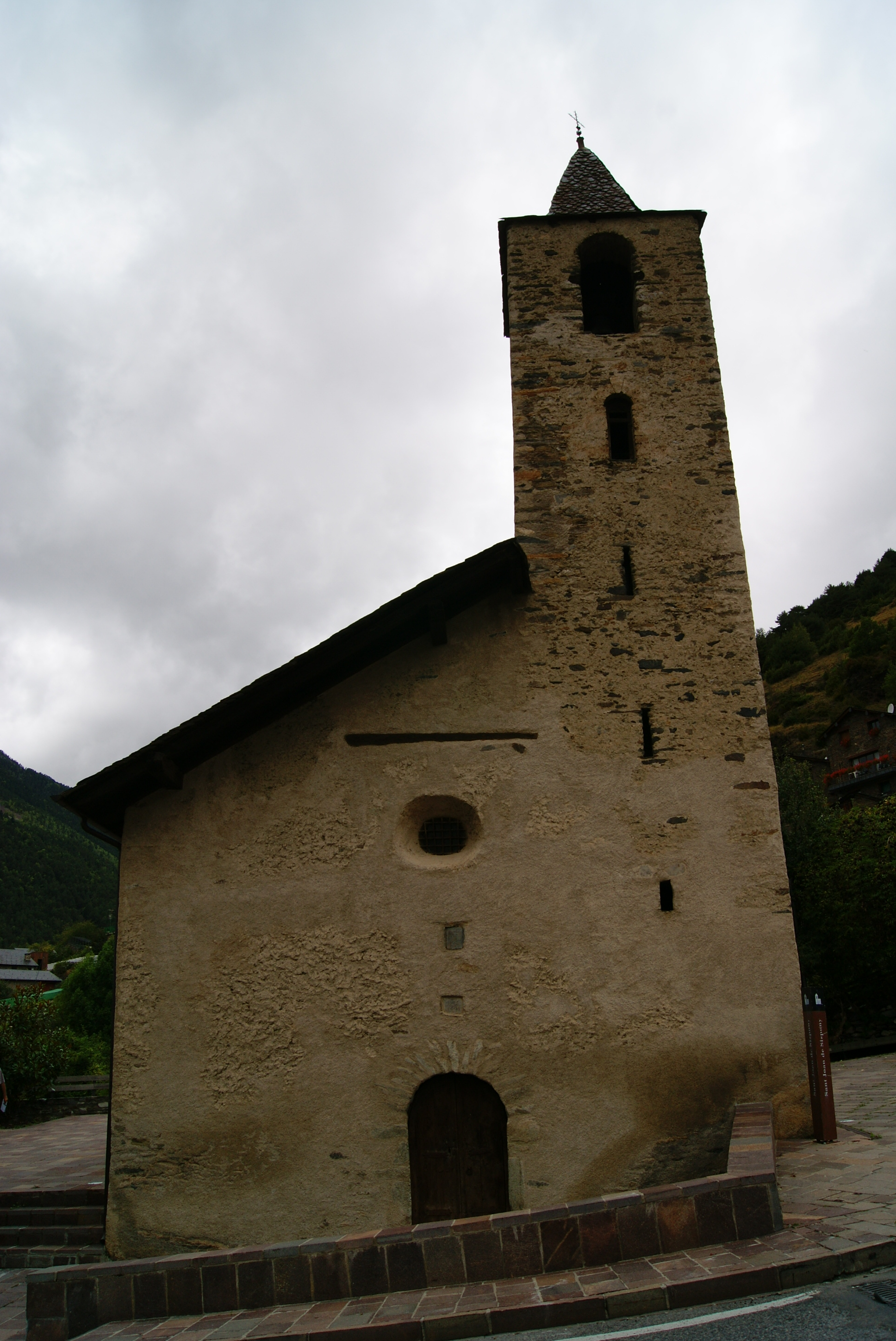
- Església de Sant Joan de Sispony
- 42°32′01″N 1°30′58″E
- Location: Sispony, La Massana, Andorra
- Country: Andorra
- Denomination: Catholic Church
- Sui iuris church: Latin Church

Architecture
- Completed: 1641

Església de Sant Joan de Sispony is a church located in Sispony, La Massana, Andorra, that had its construction finished in 1641. It replaced a previous Romanesque church in the area. Josep Oromí i Muntada created murals and other artwork for the church in the 19th century.

Cèsar Martinell i Brunet, who restored other churches in Andorra, led restoration efforts for Església de Sant Joan de Sispony until 1967. It was registered as a heritage property registered by the Cultural Heritage of Andorra on 16 July 2003. Maintenance was done to the church's bell tower after Sant Vicenç d'Enclar's bell tower collapsed.

== History ==
Església de Sant Joan de Sispony is located in Sispony, La Massana, Andorra. It replaced the previous church in Sispony, the Romanesque Església de Sant Joan Vell.

Until 1967, Cèsar Martinell i Brunet was in charge of restoring multiple churches in Andorra, including Església de Sant Joan de Sispony. The Cultural Heritage of Andorra listed the church as an asset of cultural interest on 16 July 2003. In 2020, after the collapse of Sant Vicenç d'Enclar's bell tower, €27,957.09 were allocated by the government to perform maintenance work to remove rising damp on Església de Sant Joan de Sispony's bell tower.

== Structure ==
Constructed in 1641, the church uses a rectangular plan and a small building that serves as a sacristy is attached to the west wall. The façade of the building faces east. The nave is covered by a plaster barrel vault.

== Art ==
Josep Oromí i Muntada created mural paintings on the apse in the 19th century and performed work on the triumphal arch and presbytery in 1867.

== Works cited ==
=== News ===
- "Alerta, campanars". Bondia. 26 August 2020. Archived from the original on 30 April 2025.
- "Malmesa l'estructura de la casa-museu d'Areny-Plandolit pel drenatge i evacuació d'aigües pluvials". Altaveu. 26 August 2020. Archived from the original on 30 April 2025.
- "Martinell i els eterns entorns". Bondia. 9 February 2024. Archived from the original on 30 April 2025.
- "Oromí ressuscita a Sant Serni". Bondia. 8 June 2018. Archived from the original on 30 April 2025.

=== Web ===
- "Església de Sant Joan de Sispony". Cultural Heritage of Andorra. Archived from the original on 9 May 2012.
- "Sant Joan de Sispony (La Maçana)". Gran Enciclopèdia Catalana. Archived from the original on 30 April 2025.
