= Roca Entravessada =

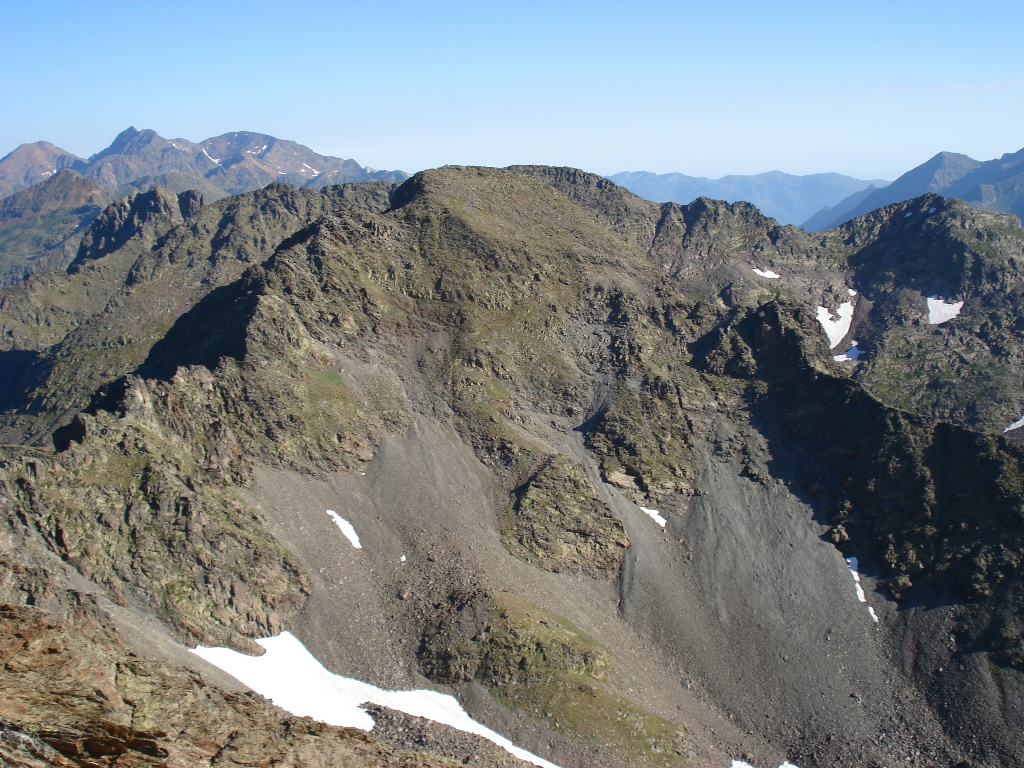
- Roca Entravessada from the Coma Pedrosa summit

Highest point
- Elevation: 2,928 m (9,606 ft)
- Coordinates: 42°35′54″N 01°26′31″E

Geography
- Location within Pyrenees
- Location: Pallars Sobirà, Andorra; Catalonia
- Parent range: Pyrenees

Climbing
- First ascent: Unknown
- Easiest route: From Alins or La Massana

Roca Entravessada is a mountain of Catalonia. Located in the Pyrenees, at the border between Spain and Andorra, it has an altitude of 2928 metres above sea level.

The name of the mountain means "Rock Askew" in the Catalan language. One of the routes to reach it passes by the Estanys Forcats from Arinsal, Andorra.

== See also ==
- Pyrenees
- Mountains of Catalonia
