= Estanys de Baiau =

Two lakes in the Spanish Pyrenees

Coordinates: 42.595634°N 1.430132°E

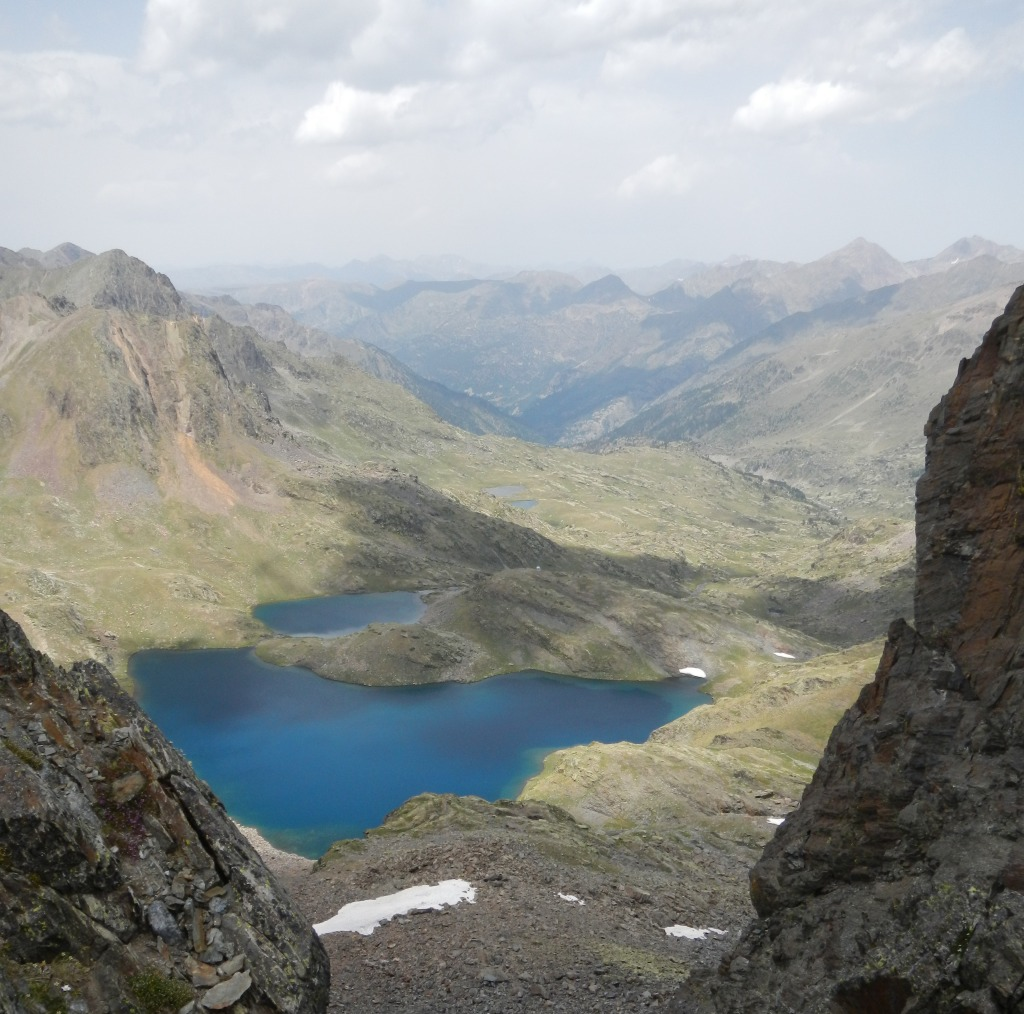

- Location within Spain
- Location: Catalonia, Spain
- Type: Glacial lakes
- Primary outflows: Riu de Baiau
- Basin countries: Spain

Estanys de Baiau (Catalan pronunciation: [əsˈtaɲz də βəˈjaw]) are a pair of lakes in Catalonia, Spain approximately 1 kilometre from the border with Andorra. The lakes are surrounded by mountains, including Pic de Baiau and Coma Pedrosa—the highest mountain in Andorra—to the east, and Pic de Sanfonts to the south. They are both drained by the Riu de Baiau, a tributary of the Barranc d'Arcalís.

The GR 11 hiking path follows the northern side of the lakes, passing Refugi de Baiau, before splitting into GR11.1, which takes an easier route north of Pic de Comapedrosa, and GR11 which follows a steep 300m climb up loose rocks to Port de Baiau at 2800m. There is a side path from there to the top of Pic de Comapedrosa, while the main route continues down to Arinsal past the Refugi de Comapedrosa.
