= Pic dels Aspres =

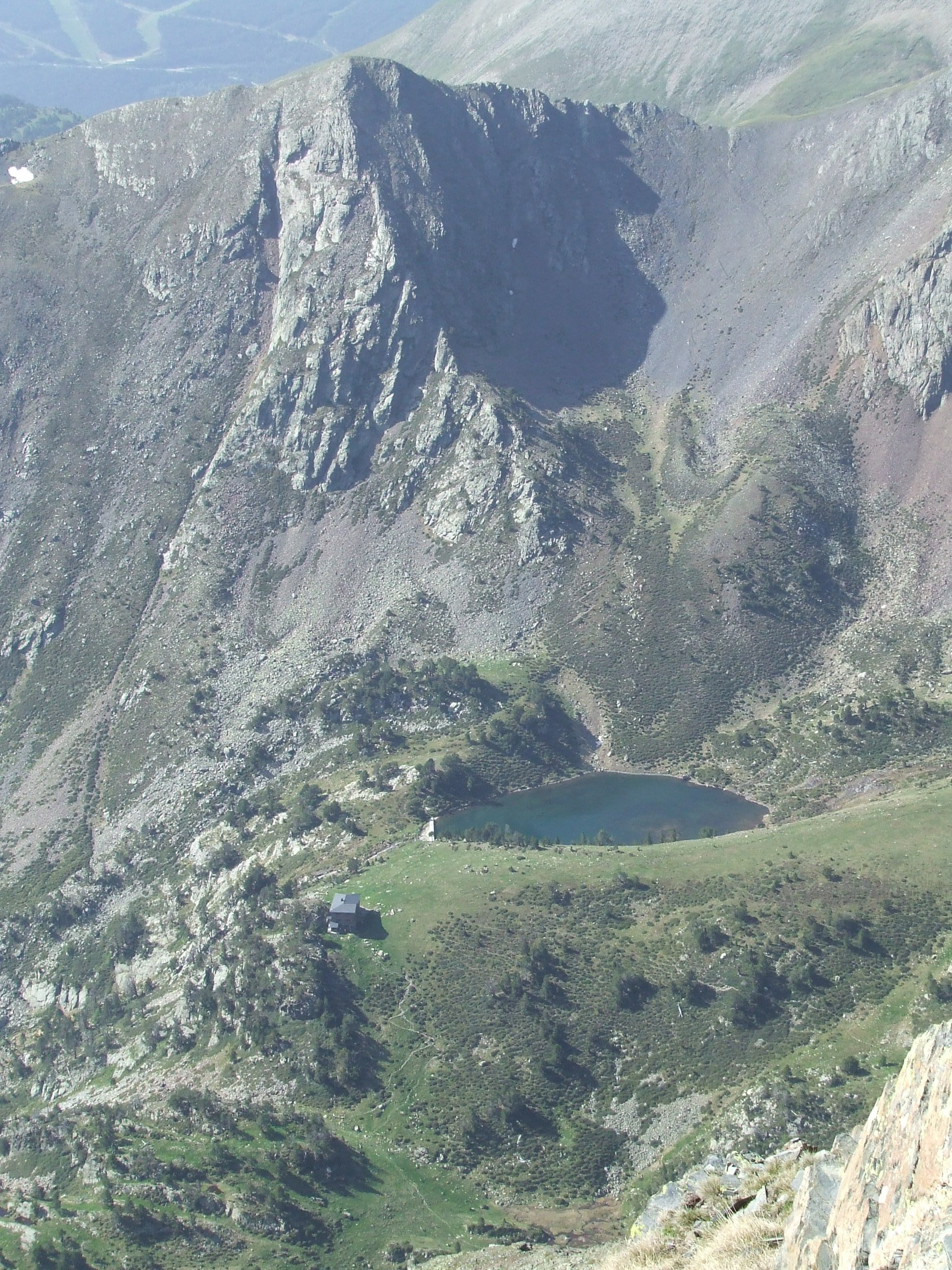
- Pic del Aspres, Estany de les Truites and Refugi de Coma Pedrosa.

Highest point
- Elevation: 2,562 m (8,406 ft)
- Parent peak: Pic del Port Vell
- Coordinates: 42°34′45″N 1°27′05″E

Geography
- Location within Andorra
- Location: La Massana parish, Andorra
- Parent range: Pyrenees

Pic dels Aspres is a mountain in the northwest of the principality of Andorra, close to the border with Spain. The nearest town is Arinsal, La Massana.

== Geographic features ==
Some 250 metres below the summit is a round cirque, approximately 100 metres in diameter, which was formed by glacial erosion during the Last Glacial Maximum and which is now a lake, Estany de les Truites (the trout lake).

The valley to the south of the mountain is used as a ski area.

== History ==
During the Neolithic, sedentary populations inhabited the dels Aspres hills, and built megalithic dolmens in the area.
