= Xixerella =

Village in La Massana, Andorra

- Location in Andorra
- Coordinates: 42°33′N 1°29′E
- Country: Andorra
- Parish: La Massana

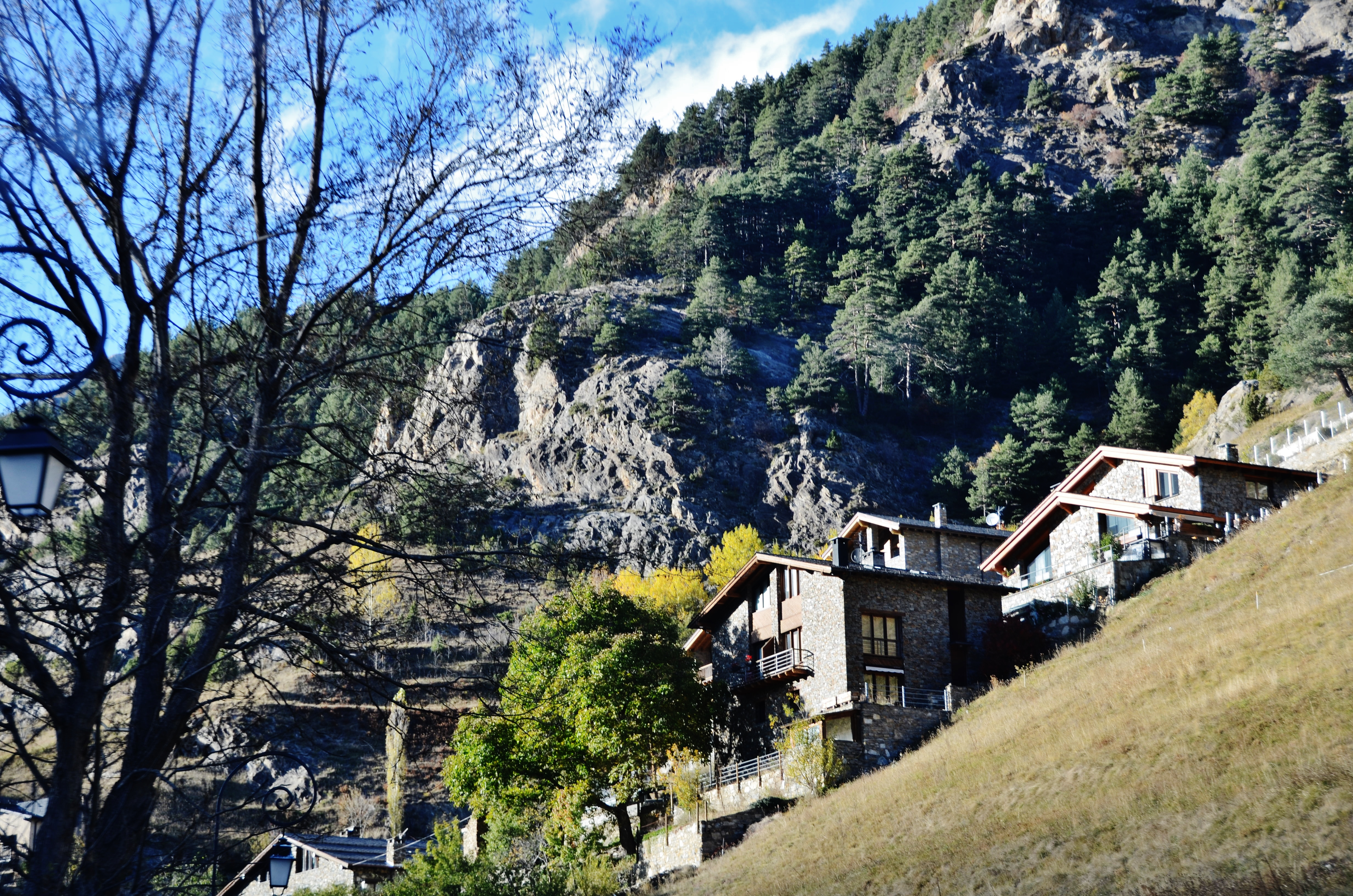
Xixerella in 2013

Xixerella (Catalan pronunciation: [ʃiʃeˈɾeʎa]) is a small village of a few houses and chalets in the La Massana parish of the principality of Andorra. It is located at 1414 m of altitude, between the villages of Erts and Pal and a few minutes from the Vallnord ski resort.
