= Antoni Garrallà =

Andorran politician and hotelier (1943/1944–2025)

Antoni Garrallà Rossell (1943 or 1944 – 1 May 2025) was an Andorran politician and hotelier. He was the mayor of La Massana from 1995 until 2003, and deputy general syndic of the General Council from 1985 to 1989.

He promoted Andorran tourism, and operated the Hotel Rutllan.

Garrallà died on 1 May 2025, at the age of 81.
