= L'Aldosa de la Massana =

Village in La Massana, Andorra

- Village
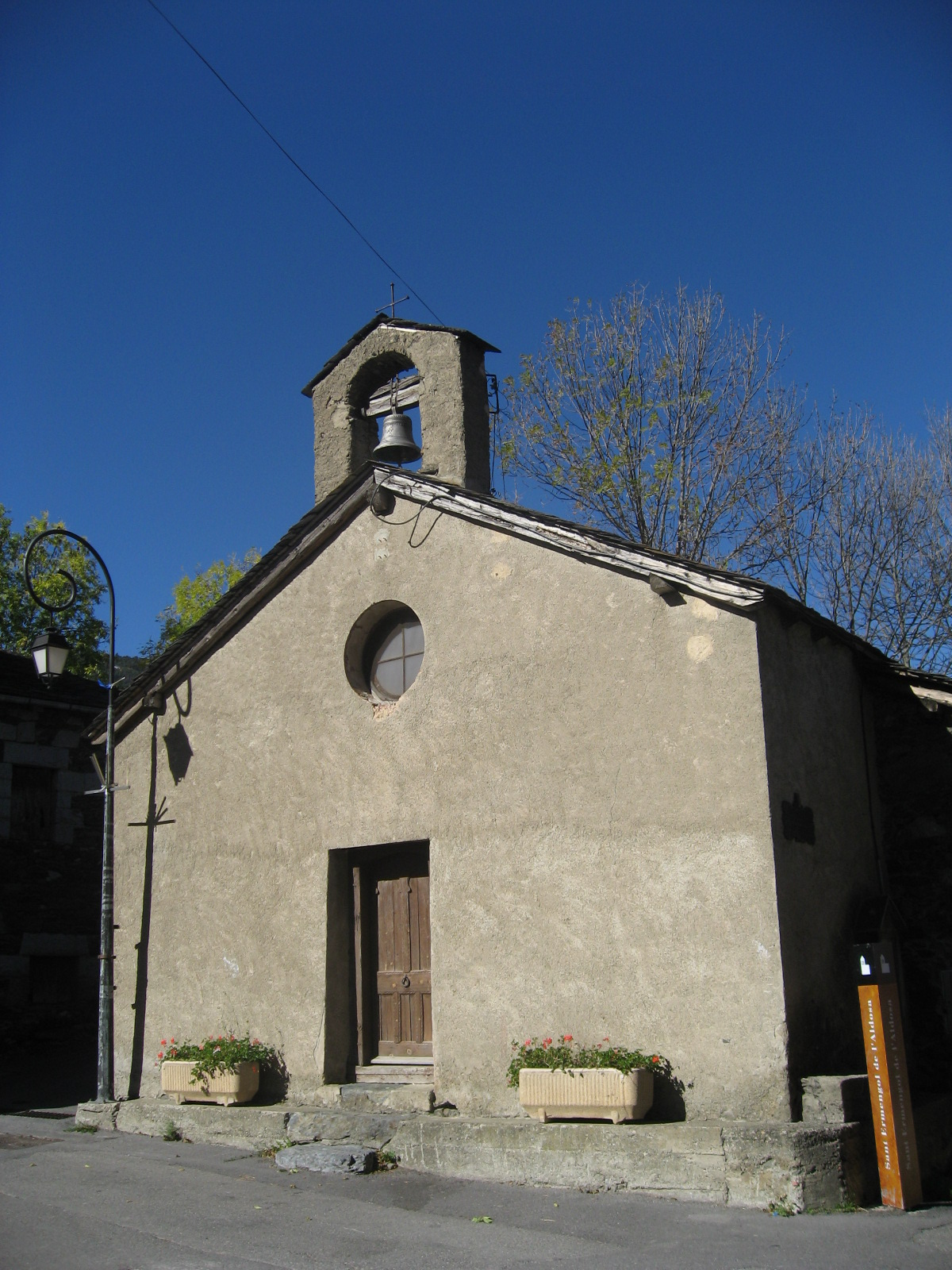
- Sant Ermengol de l'Aldosa

- Location in Andorra
- Coordinates: 42°32.65′N 1°31.33′E
- Country: Andorra
- Parish: La Massana
- Elevation: 1,295 m (4,249 ft)
- Post code: AD400
- ISO 3166 code: ISO 3166-2:AD

L'Aldosa de la Massana (Catalan pronunciation: [lalˈdoza ðe la maˈsana]), known simply as L'Aldosa, is a village in Andorra, located in the parish of La Massana.

The church of Sant Ermengol de l'Aldosa is located there.
