= Tossa Plana de Lles =

Mountain in Andorra and Spain

Tossa Plana de Lles Pic de la Portelleta

Highest point
- Elevation: 2,903 m (9,524 ft)

Geography
- Location: Andorra and Catalonia, Spain
- Parent range: Pyrenees

Tossa Plana de Lles or Pic de la Portelleta is a mountain of Andorra and Catalonia, Spain. Located in the Pyrenees, it has an elevation of 2,903 metres above sea level.

The name "Pic de la Portelleta" is used in Andorra, while "Tossa Plana de Lles" is used in Spain.

== See also ==
- Geography of Andorra
- Mountains of Catalonia
