= Tower of the Moors =

Andorran medieval fortification

- Encamp, Andorra
- The Tower of the Moors on its promontory.

Location
- Coordinates: 42.539323°N 1.587097°E

The Tower of the Moors, also known as Le Bons Castle, is an Andorran military outpost dating from Medieval times. The tower was built sometime between the 12th or 13th Century. The tower was rebuilt to repel the Huguenots, which began raiding Andorra in the 16th Century. The tower is perched on a hilltop overlooking the Encamp Valley.

== Description ==
The arrow loopholes can be seen on the left side of the photo.

The tower is square in shape, and like many defensive structures, has thick walls to repel projectiles and heavy weapons. The tower was constructed out of limestone and slate, common materials used in fortifications in the Pyrenees. These materials were also used because they insulated the tower during the long alpine winters. In the 18th Century, the tower was renovated to update its defensive capabilities. A square sink can still be seen in the remains of the tower. On the top of the fort were several slits for firing arrows, called loopholes.

== History ==
The church of Sant Rosa on the left and the Tower of the Moors on the right.

A spiral staircase installed by the Andorran Government to facilitate viewing from the top of the tower.

The tower was originally built in the 12th or 13th Century, and was one of the most important defensive fortifications in Andorra, alongside the Fortified Church of Sant Vicenc d'Enclar. The hill was built on a promontory overlooking the Encamp Valley, and it was supposed to watch the valley for invaders. The tower served to alert the residents to an invasion. In the 13th Century, the Pact of Pareatge established Andorra as a free state, but ordered that no new castles be built and all existing fortifications be demolished. With this, the tower became a religious site to avoid being torn down. The tower was regularly used for community gatherings and religious ceremonies until the 16th Century, when the tower was pressed into use to help repel Huguenot raids. After those died out later in the 16th Century, the tower returned to religious and communal purposes. Mass was performed both in the tower and in the Sant Rosa Church, which had been constructed in the 13th Century. The reddish color of the walls inside means that the structure suffered a fire, most likely in the 18th Century, when the building was abandoned. Thanks to the Government of Andorra, a staircase has been set up so that you can view the surroundings from the top of the tower. From the top you are able to see the French border.

== See also ==
- Fortified Church of Sant Vicenc d'Enclar
- Casa de la Vall
- Church of Santa Coloma d'Andorra
