= Sispony =

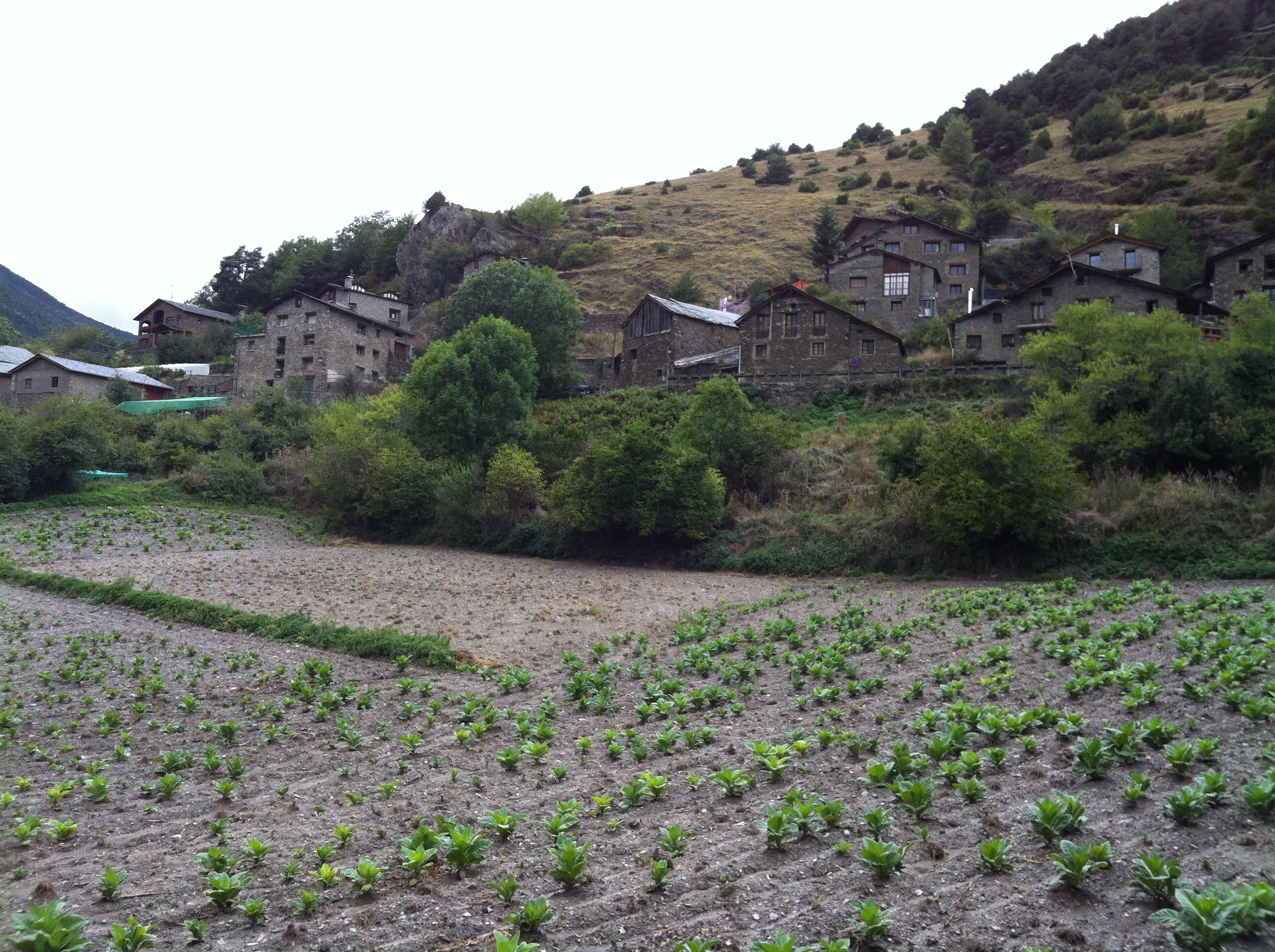

- Location in Andorra
- Coordinates: 42°32′N 1°31′E
- Country: Andorra
- Parish: La Massana
- Elevation: 1,360 m (4,460 ft)

Population (2023)
  - Total: 833

Sispony (Catalan pronunciation: [sisˈpoɲ]) is a village in Andorra, and one of the country's 44 official poblacions. It is located in the parish of La Massana.

== Geography ==
The village is located in the west of the country, adjacent to the town of La Massana and the CG-3 main road. The CS-320 secondary road connects Sispony to these.

== Culture ==
The village is home to the Església de Sant Joan de Sispony, a Catholic church. Built around the 13th century, it has since been designated an Andorran cultural heritage site.

== Gallery ==
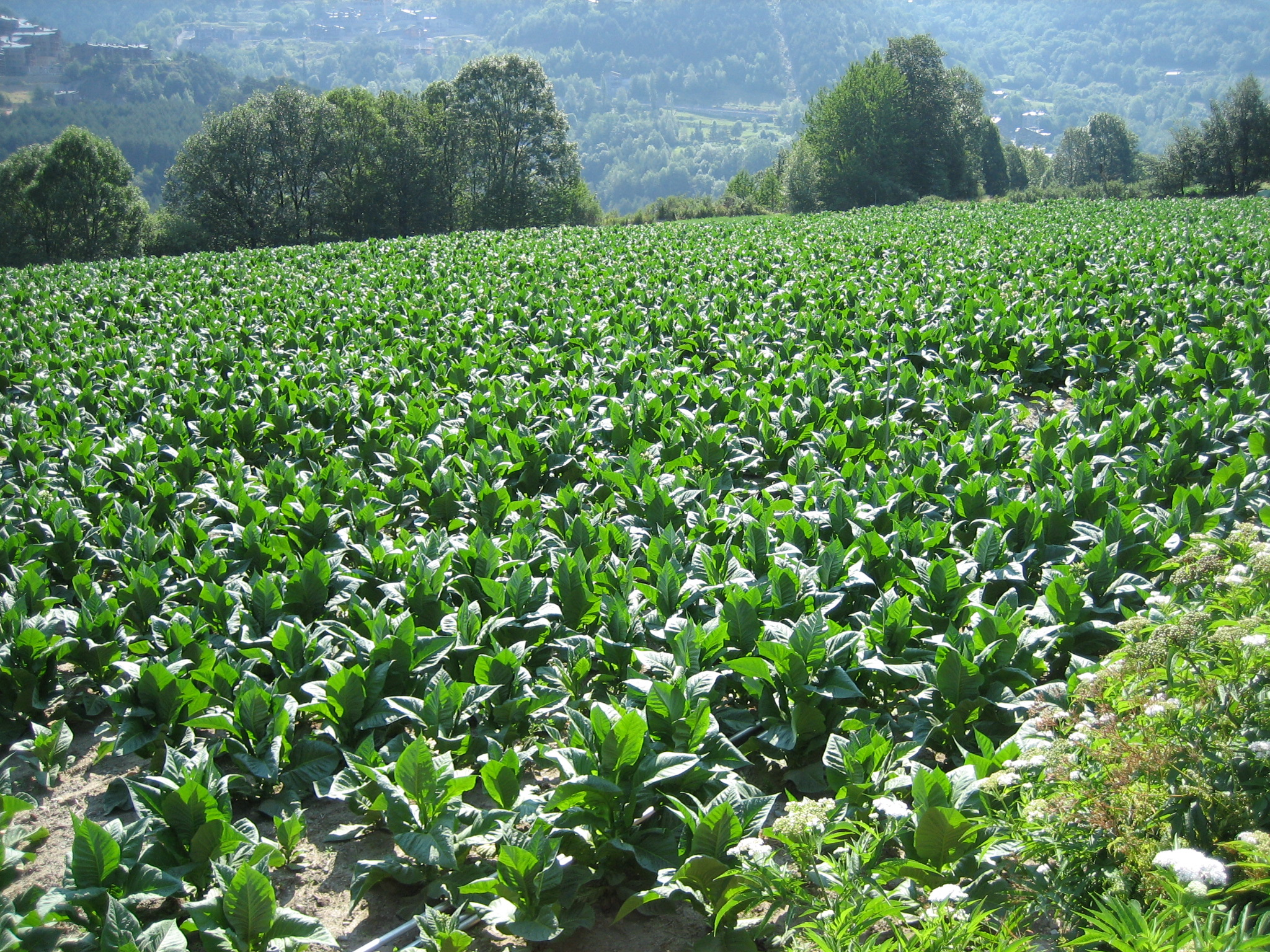
A field of tobacco plants in Sispony
