= Pic del Port Vell =

Mountain in Andorra

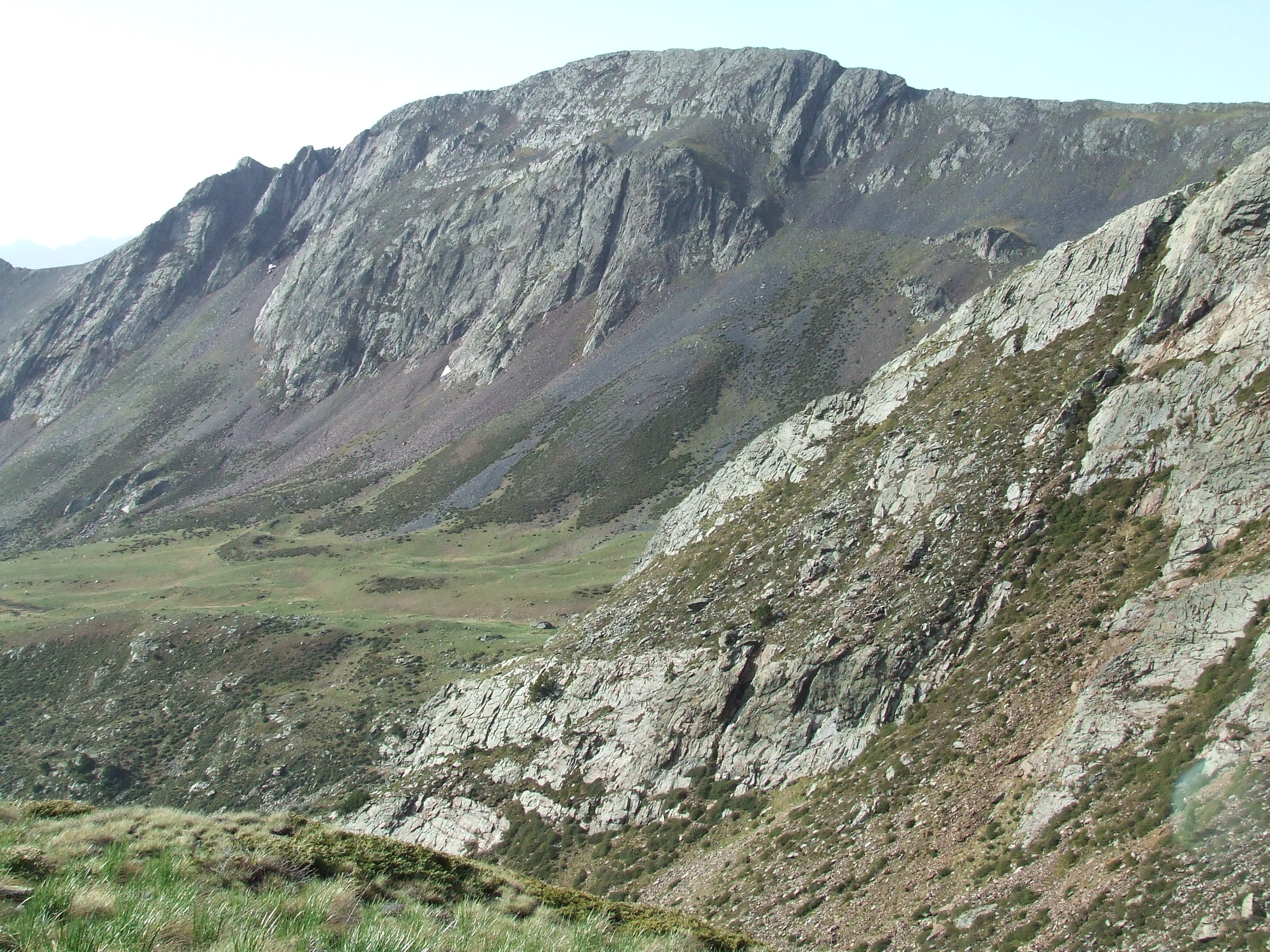
- Pic del Port Vell from the north

Highest point
- Elevation: 2,655 m (8,711 ft)
- Coordinates: 42°34′19″N 1°26′36″E

Geography
- Location within Pyrenees
- Location: Andorra
- Parent range: Pyrenees

Pic del Port Vell is a mountain in the Pyrenees on the border of Spain and northwest Andorra. The nearest town is Arinsal, La Massana, in Andorra.
