= Escàs =

Village in La Massana, Andorra

- Location in Andorra
- Coordinates: 42°33′N 1°31′E
- Country: Andorra
- Parish: La Massana
- Elevation: 1,396 m (4,580 ft)

Population (2005)
  - Total: 740
- Time zone: UTC+1 (CET)

Escàs (Catalan pronunciation: [asˈkas]) is a village in Andorra, located in the parish of La Massana.

== Sport ==
The construction company, Construccions Buiques, has its head office in Escàs, and sponsors a football team Construccions Buiques Rànger's, also known informally as FC Rànger's, that plays in Andorra's national First Division football league.
