= Parc Natural Comunal de les Valls del Comapedrosa =

National park in Andorra

- IUCN category IV (habitat/species management area)
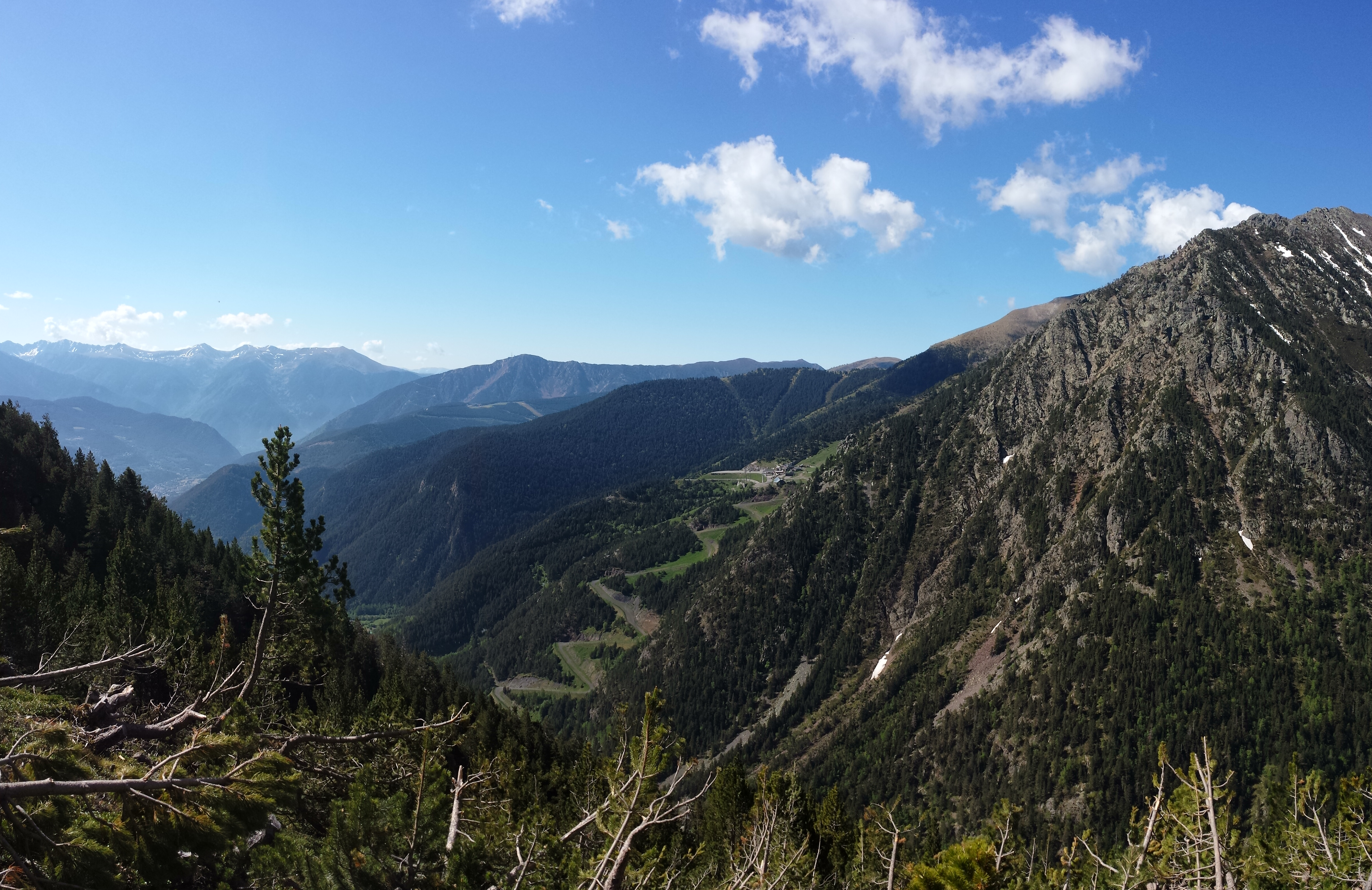
- A valley within the park

- Location within Andorra
- Location: Parc Natural Comunal de les Valls del Comapedrosa
- Nearest city: Arinsal
- Coordinates: 42°35′26″N 1°28′03″E
- Area: 15.43km^2
- Established: 2003
- Website: www.comapedrosa.ad/ca/

Parc Natural Comunal de les Valls del Comapedrosa is a protected national park in the western portion of Andorra. It contains the highest point in Andorra, Coma Pedrosa, among other peaks. It is closest to the town of Erts. Established in 2003, it is currently being developed by Ramsar.

There is a hiking trail that is accessible to the public, and offers a moderate hike which can take up to 4 hours. A small fee may be associated with the hike.
