= Pic de Sanfonts =

Mountain in Andorra and Spain

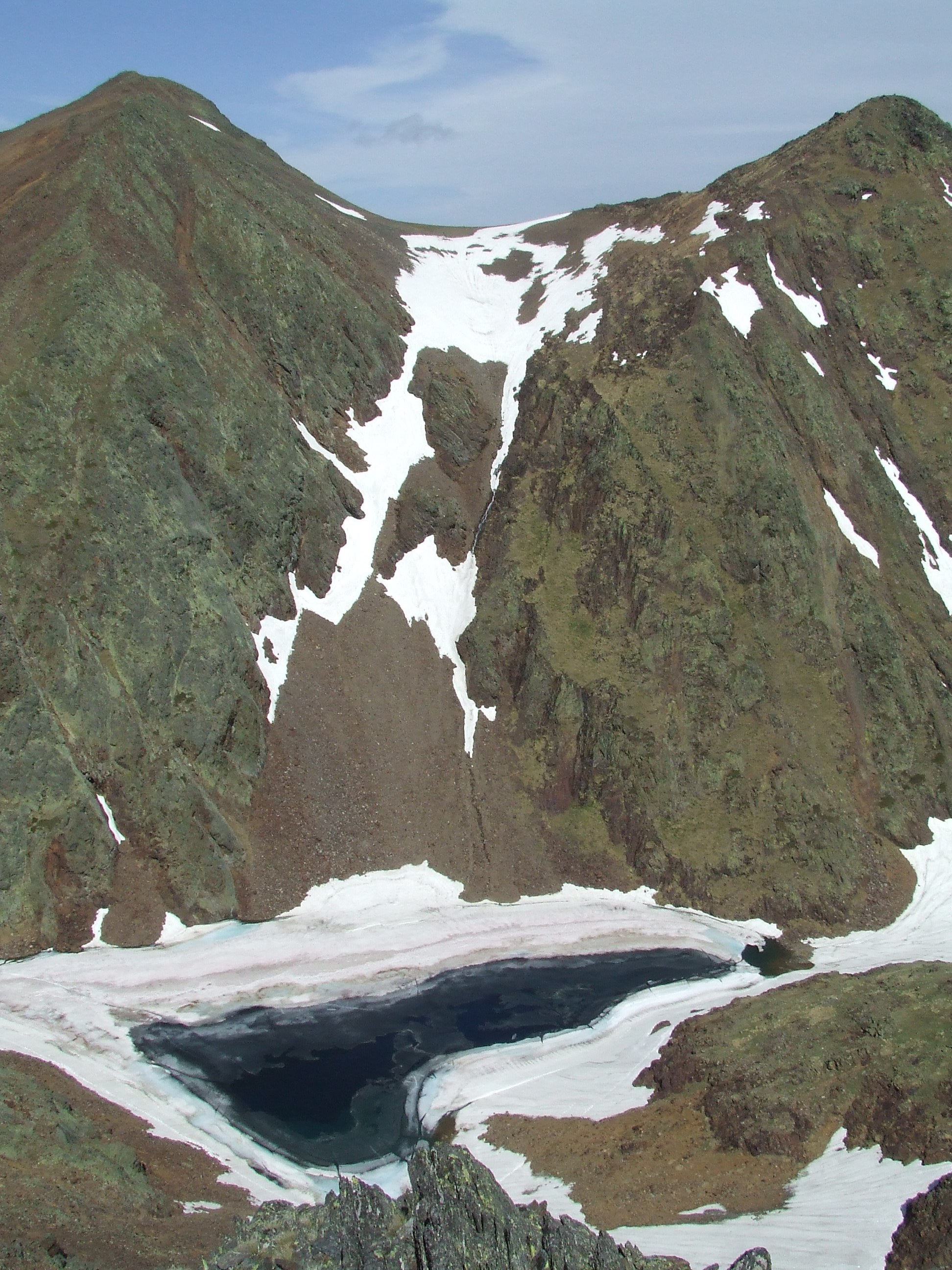
- Pic de Sanfonts (left), Agulla de Baiau (right) and Estany Negre.

Highest point
- Elevation: 2,894 m (9,495 ft)
- Prominence: 150 m (490 ft)
- Coordinates: 42°35′16″N 1°25′51″E

Geography
- Location within Pyrenees
- Location: Andorra
- Parent range: Pyrenees

Pic de Sanfonts (Catalan pronunciation: [ˈpiɡ də səmˈfɔns]) is a mountain in the Pyrenees on the border of Spain and northwest Andorra. The nearest town is Arinsal, La Massana. It is a subpeak of, and 1.2 km southwest of, Coma Pedrosa (2942 m), the highest mountain in Andorra.
