= Casa Rull Museum =

Historic house in La Massana, Andorra

- Casa Rull
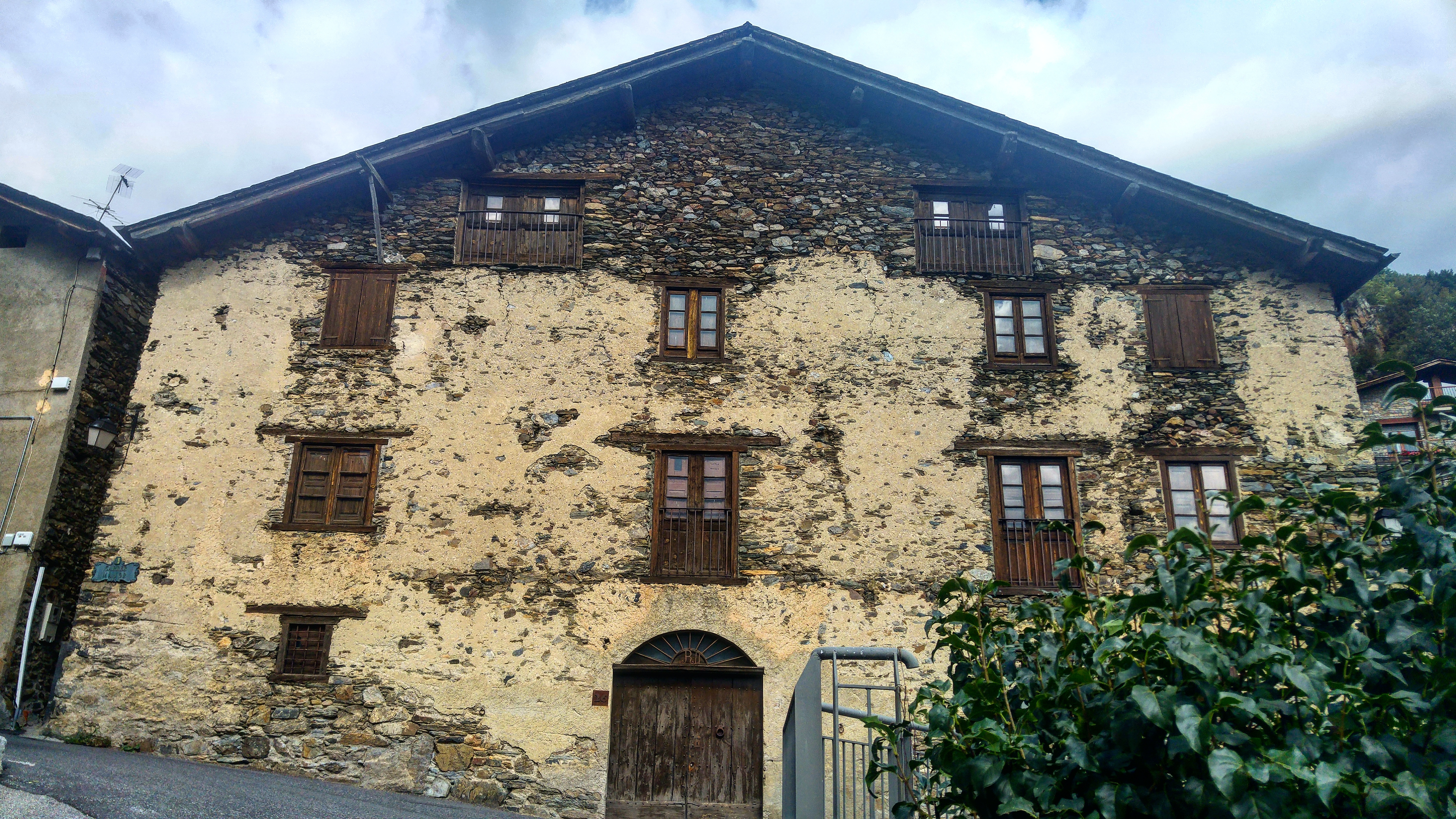
- Exterior of Casa Rull
- Established: 2000
- Location: La Massana, Andorra
- Coordinates: 42°31′56.5″N 1°30′51.0″E
- Type: Historic house museum

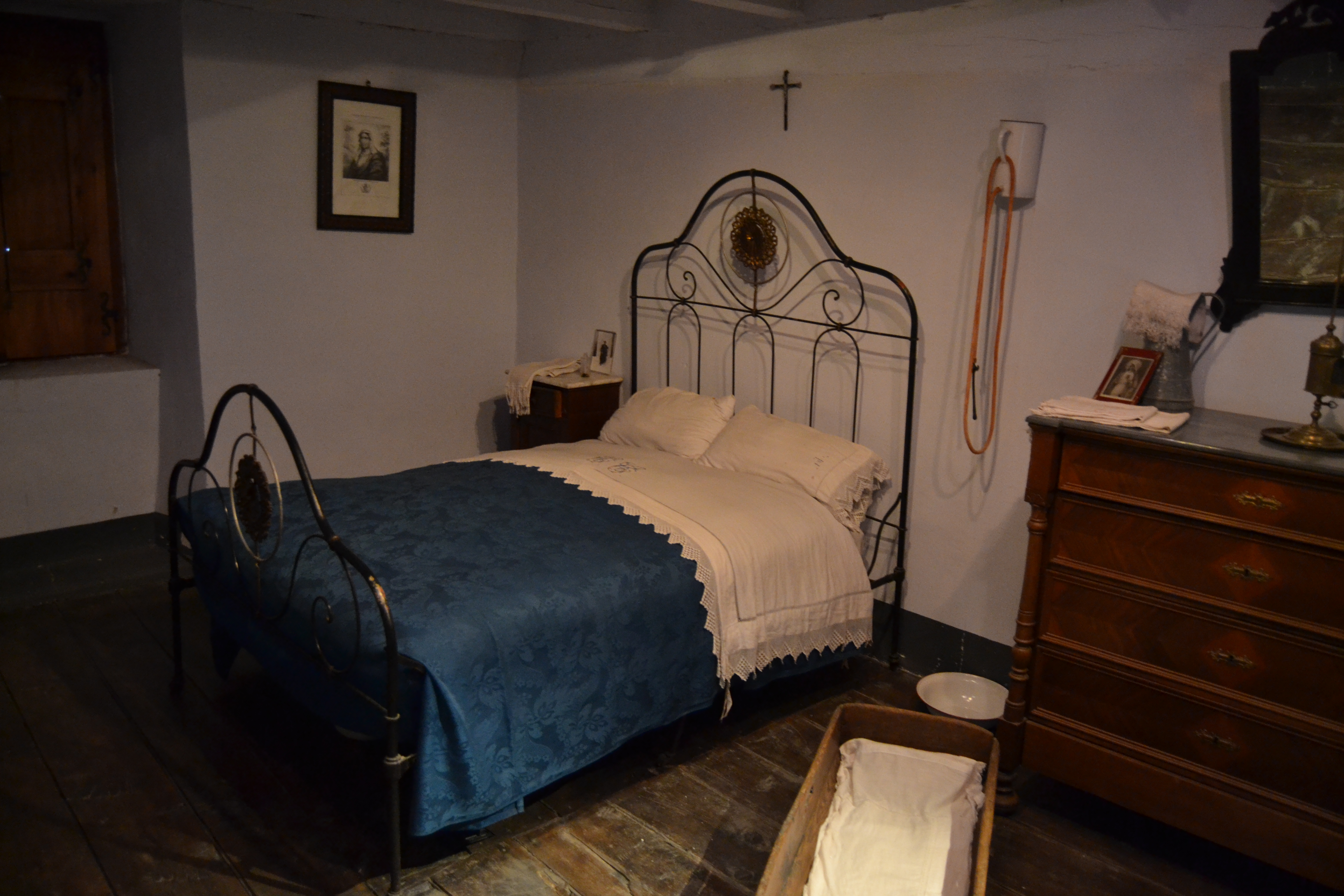
A bedroom

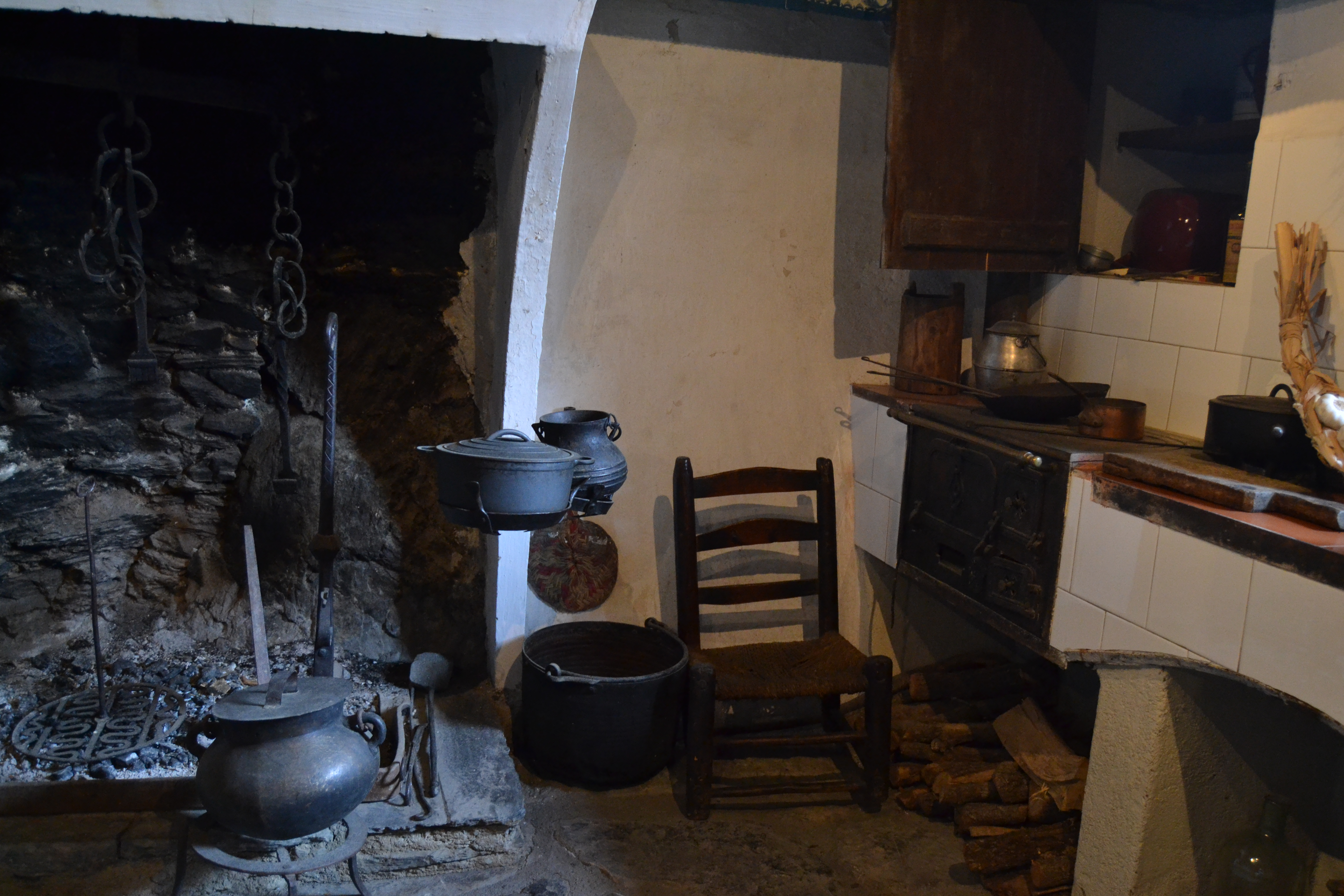
Kitchen

The Casa Rull Museum is a historic house in La Massana, Andorra. It is named for the Rull family, landowning farmers, but grew to prominence when the Perich family of wealthy merchants married into the family in 1757. The house dates to 1732, but is on the site of earlier structures owned by the Rulls. It burnt down in the late 19th century, leaving only the stone walls, and was afterwards rebuilt. In 2000 the Andorran government opened the house as a museum.

== History ==
The Rull family is one of the oldest in Andorra, dating back to the 14th century. The current Casa Rull in La Massana was built in 1723. It was constructed on the site of two earlier buildings, one known by the same name and one known as the Pere Rull. The Rulls were farmers who grew cereals and legumes and raised sheep. Although the family name of the occupants changed over the years the house was still known as the Casa Rull. The building consists of three storeys plus an attic.

The house and family was one of the foremost in La Massana by 1757 when Tomàs Perich married into the family. Perich was a wealthy merchant from Andorra la Vella who had made his fortune trading mules and sheep with Catalonia, taking advantage of differences in national tax regimes. Under the Perichs Casa Rull rose in status and the occupants came to be considered "pagesos grassos" (literally: "fat peasants"), a petite bourgeoisie class of landowning farmers. While the Rull occupants had been second-class councillors in the Consell de la Terra the Perichs became first-class councillors and, from the late 19th century, some members became syndic (president).

The Casa Rull suffered a severe fire in the late 19th century that started in the oven and burnt all of the wooden structure, leaving only the stone walls. The houseowner at the time sold livestock and took out loans to fund the rebuilding of Casa Rull.

The last private owner of the Casa Rull was Josep Perich Puigcercós. He reached agreement with the Andorran government to transform the structure into a museum.

== Museum ==
The museum opened on 9 June 2000. It shows the house as it might have been in the late 19th century when it was occupied by the Perich family. The museum costs 5 euros to enter with a supplement for a guided tour. It is part of the Andorra Museumpass scheme and is on the Andorran government museums "rural habitat" itinerary.

Over the Christmas and New Year period of 2021/2022 the house hosted an exhibition of rural life in Andorra portrayed through Playmobil dioramas. The exhibition featured 500 figures from the collection of Chile-born Andorra resident Daniel Arellano.
