= Andorra la Vella Heliport =

- IATA: ALV; ICAO: none

Summary
- Serves: Andorra la Vella
- Location: Andorra la Vella
- Coordinates: 42°30′40″N 001°32′01″E

Map
- Location on a map of Andorra

Andorra la Vella Heliport (IATA: ALV) is a heliport located in Andorra la Vella, the capital city of the Principality of Andorra.

There are two other heliports in Andorra, at La Massana and Arinsal.

There are no scheduled passenger flights to these heliports, but it is possible to book taxi flights from Barcelona, Lleida, Perpignan, or Toulouse for fixed prices. There is no airport in Andorra. The nearest one is Andorra–La Seu d'Urgell Airport in Spain around 12 km from the border, however having limited scheduled flights.

== See also ==
- List of countries without an airport
