= Sant Vicenç d'Enclar =

Fortified church in Andorra

A photo of the church from 1954, 102 years after regular masses stopped.

Sant Vicenç d'Enclar is an Andorran fortification constructed during the middle ages. The church was constructed on the Roc D’Enclar hill which overlooks Andorra’s central valley.

== History ==
Sant Vicenç d'Enclar was built sometime between the 8th and 9th centuries, as the area began to be Christianized. The church was fortified because it sat on the high ground of the valley and raids by Islamic forces were not uncommon at the time. Thus the church was both a place of worship and a refuge for the local population during raids. This type of church was common in more remote regions where large fortifications weren’t possible. However, the large number of fortified parts of the church were rare. The church served the local area for nearly 300 years before it was replaced by a newer church. The church was built using “Lombard” styles, like rounded corners, carved walls and a robust structure.

During the 12th and 13th centuries, numerous walls and watchtowers were added to the aging fortifications. At this time, the church was anywhere between 500 and 600 years old, and was long overdue for a renovation. The church was also the oldest in Andorra. When the new fortifications of the church were complete, they made it one of the most heavily fortified churches in Europe. During the 13th century the church was renovated, which is why it has traces of Romanesque and Gothic architecture. In the 17th and 18th Centuries, reforms were made to make the church no longer a defensive structure, since it was outdated. Regular masses stopped in 1852, however Catholic Mass has been performed in the church as recently as 30 September 2026. Due to efforts by the Andorran Government, the church has been conservatively renovated, and the bell tower was reconstructed in 2022. The church is an active archeological site as it has had centuries to accumulate artifacts.

== See also ==
- Tower of the Moors
- Casa de la Vall
- Church of Santa Coloma d'Andorra
