= Pic de Médécourbe =

- Pic de Medacorba
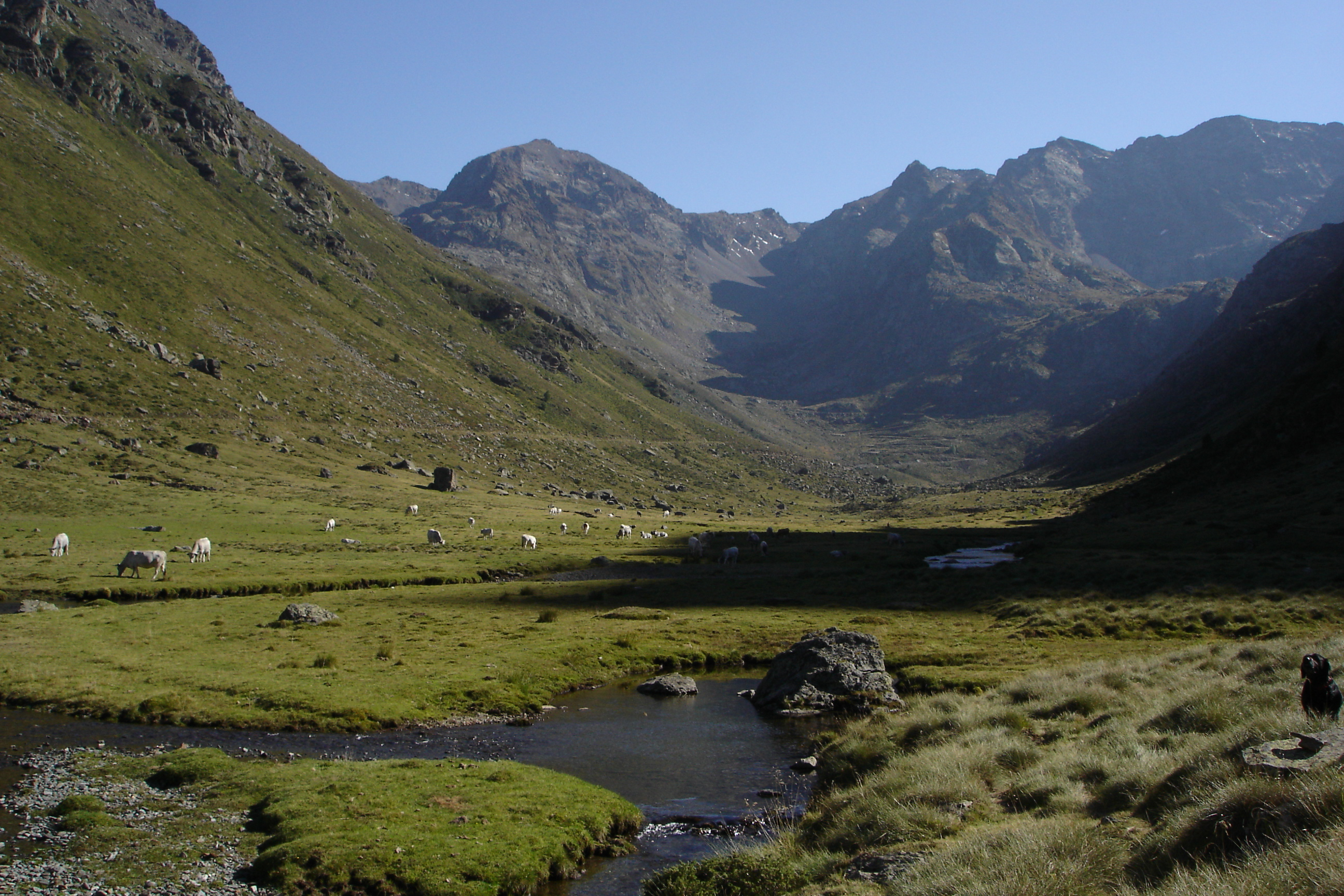
- The Vicdessos valley looking towards Pic de Médécourbe and Col de Bareytes (2859m) in the background

Highest point
- Elevation: 2,914 m (9,560 ft)
- Coordinates: 42°36′07″N 01°26′32″E

Geography
- Location within Andorra
- Location: Andorra – France – Spain border
- Parent range: Pyrenees

Pic de Médécourbe (Catalan: Pic de Medacorba) is a mountain in Europe that sits on the western tripoint boundary of Andorra, France and Spain. It is 2,914 metres (9,560 ft) tall. It overlooks Étang de Soulcem, a large artificial lake used for hydroelectricity generation, and the Vicdessos valley. There is also an eastern tripoint of Andorra, France, and Spain approximately 6 km south of Pas de la Casa.

== Geological and glacial history ==
Geological studies and glacial research conducted in the Médécourbe valley, which lies directly north of the mountain, reveal a rich history of glacial activity dating back to the Late Glacial and Holocene periods. Moraine landforms in the upper Médécourbe valley provide evidence of past glacier advances and retreats. In particular, large moraines formed around 12,400 years ago, during the transition period between the Late Glacial period and the Younger Dryas—a time when cooler climatic conditions briefly returned to Europe.

Research using cosmic ray exposure (CRE) dating techniques identified at least two distinct moraine formations from the early Holocene period (approximately 9,600 years ago). Another moraine, located near the highest part of the valley, could represent glacier advances occurring either during the Late Holocene or the Little Ice Age (between the 14th and 19th centuries CE), but its exact age remains undetermined. This history indicates that the Médécourbe valley experienced substantial climatic changes, with significant cooling episodes necessary to explain these glacial expansions. Climatic models suggest that the local climate was approximately 3.9 °C cooler than present-day conditions, which allowed glaciers to form and persist at lower altitudes.

Today, the Médécourbe catchment no longer has a glacier due to the current climatic conditions, which are warmer and less favourable to ice formation. However, a small permanent snow patch persists at the base of the mountain's steep northern cliffs, maintained by shading and frequent snow avalanches.
