= Erts =

Village in La Massana, Andorra

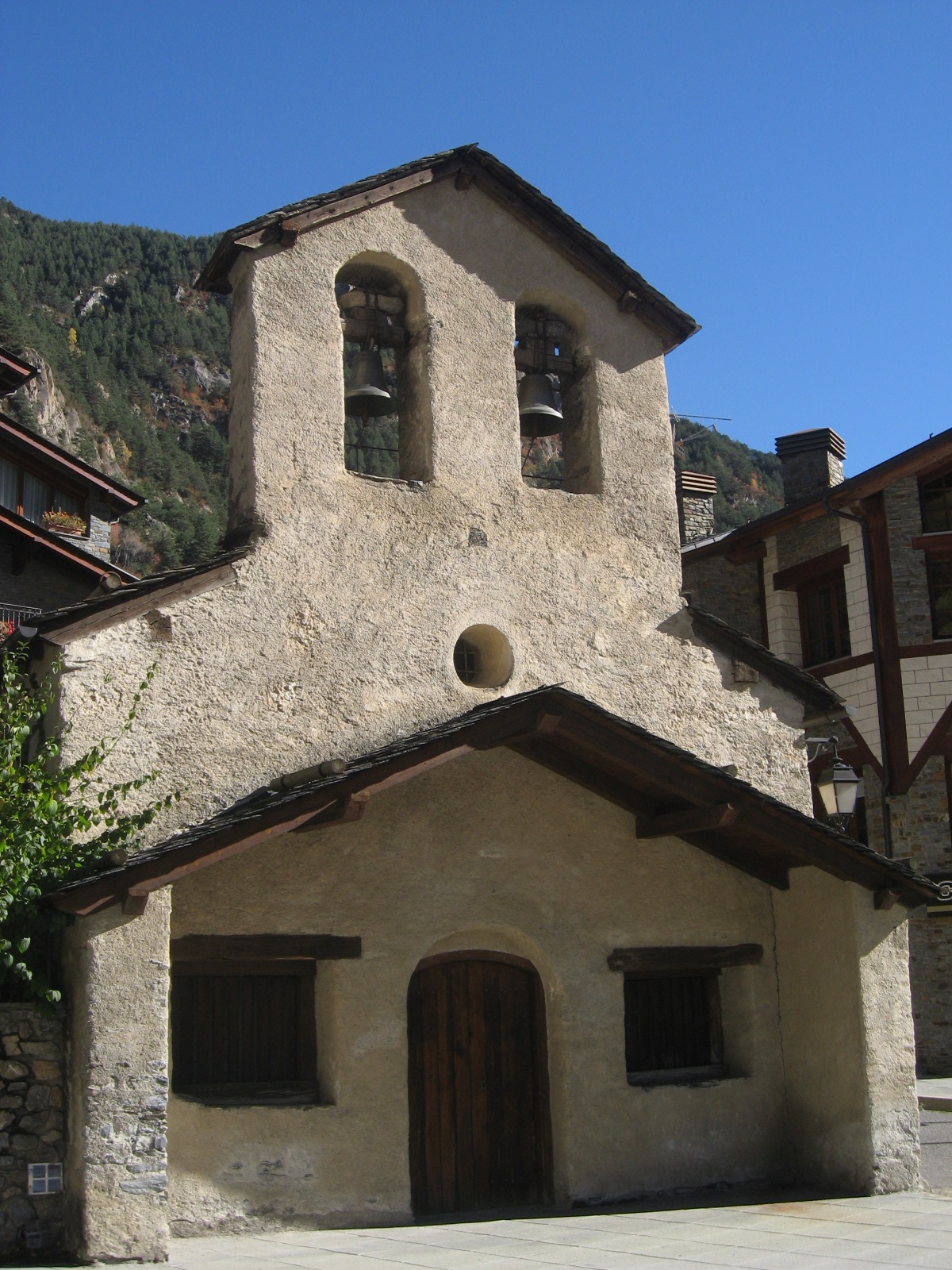

- Location in Andorra
- Coordinates: 42°33′49″N 1°29′42″E
- Country: Andorra
- Parish: La Massana
- Elevation: 1,666 m (5,466 ft)

Population (2012)
  - Total: 451
- Time zone: UTC+1 (CET)
- Postal Code: AD400

Erts (Catalan pronunciation: [ˈɛɾts]) is a village in Andorra.

In 2024, the Council of Ministers allocated funds to widen a 120-m stretch of carriageway on General Road 4 (CG-4) between Erts and La Massana.
