= La Massana =

Parish in western Andorra

- Parish
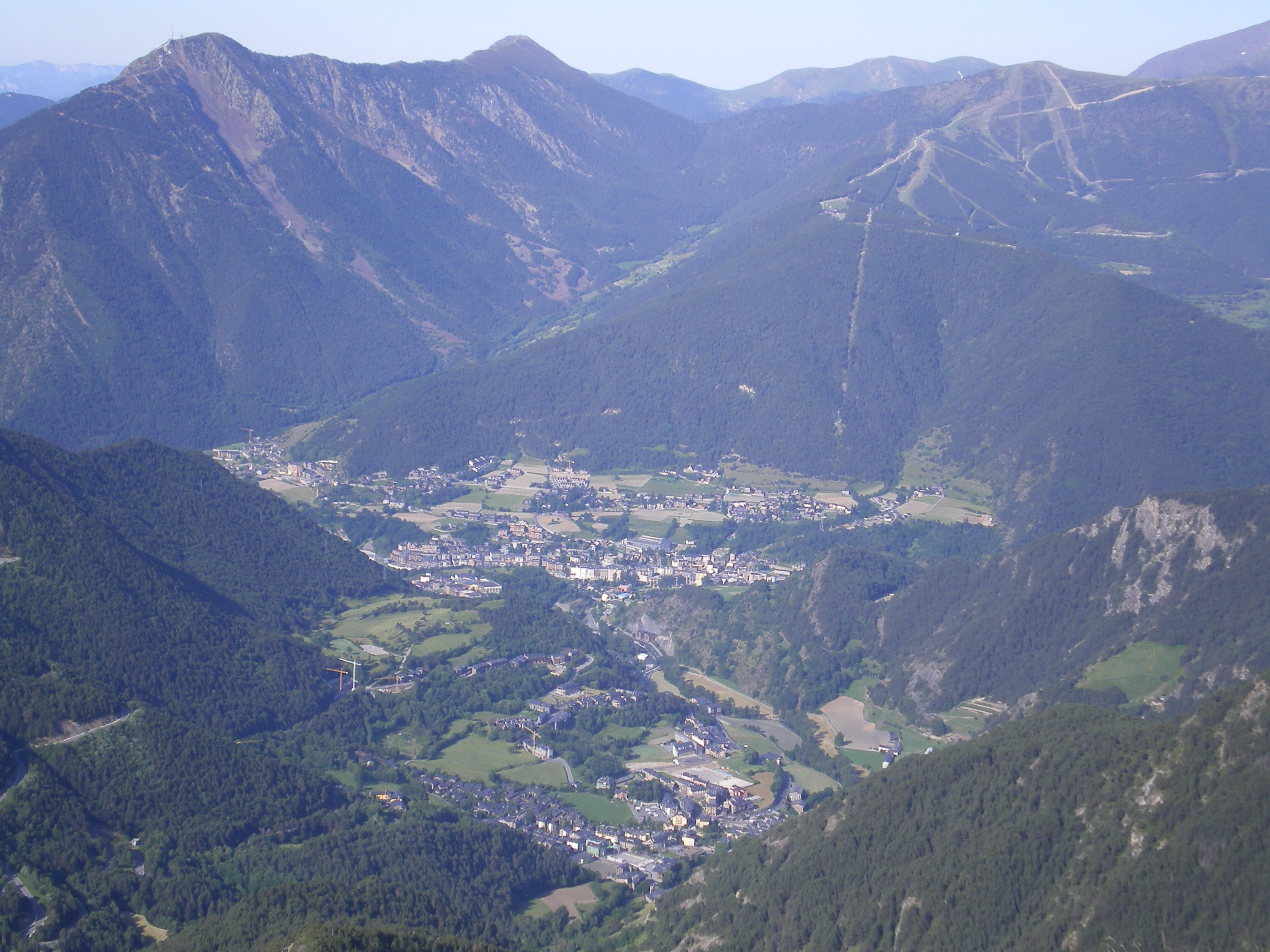
- The towns of La Massana and Ordino (in the foreground) viewed from the peak of Casamanya (2740 m)

- Flag Coat of arms

- Location within Andorra
- Coordinates (La Massana town): 42°32′40″N 1°30′52″E
- Country: Andorra
- Parishes: La Massana
- Villages: Anyós, Arinsal, El Pui, Erts, Escàs, L'Aldosa, Mas de Ribafeta, Pal, Puiol del Piu, Sispony, Xixerella

Government
  - Mayor: David Baró Riba (CC)

Area
  - Total: 65 km^{2} (25 sq mi)
- Highest elevation: 2,942 m (9,652 ft)
- Lowest elevation: 1,134 m (3,720 ft)

Population (2015)
  - Total: 10,359
  - Density: 160/km^{2} (410/sq mi)
- Demonym(s): Massanenc, Massanenca
- Time zone: UTC+1 (CET)
  - Summer (DST): UTC+2 (CEST)
- Postal code: AD400
- ISO 3166 code: AD-04
- Website: www.lamassana.ad

La Massana (Catalan pronunciation: [la maˈsana]; originally La Maçana) is one of the seven parishes of the Principality of Andorra. It is located in the northwest of the country. La Massana is also the name of the main town of the parish. The name Massana derives from the Latin name mattianam for a variety of apple. Other settlements in the parish are Pal, Arinsal, Erts, Sispony, Anyós, L'Aldosa de la Massana, Puiol del Pui, Escàs, Els Plans, Mas de Ribafeta, Xixerella and Pui.

The parish is extremely mountainous and contains the highest mountain in Andorra, Coma Pedrosa (2,942 m or 9,652 ft). Its western side limits with Tor, Pallars municipal term, in the border with Spain.

== Geography ==
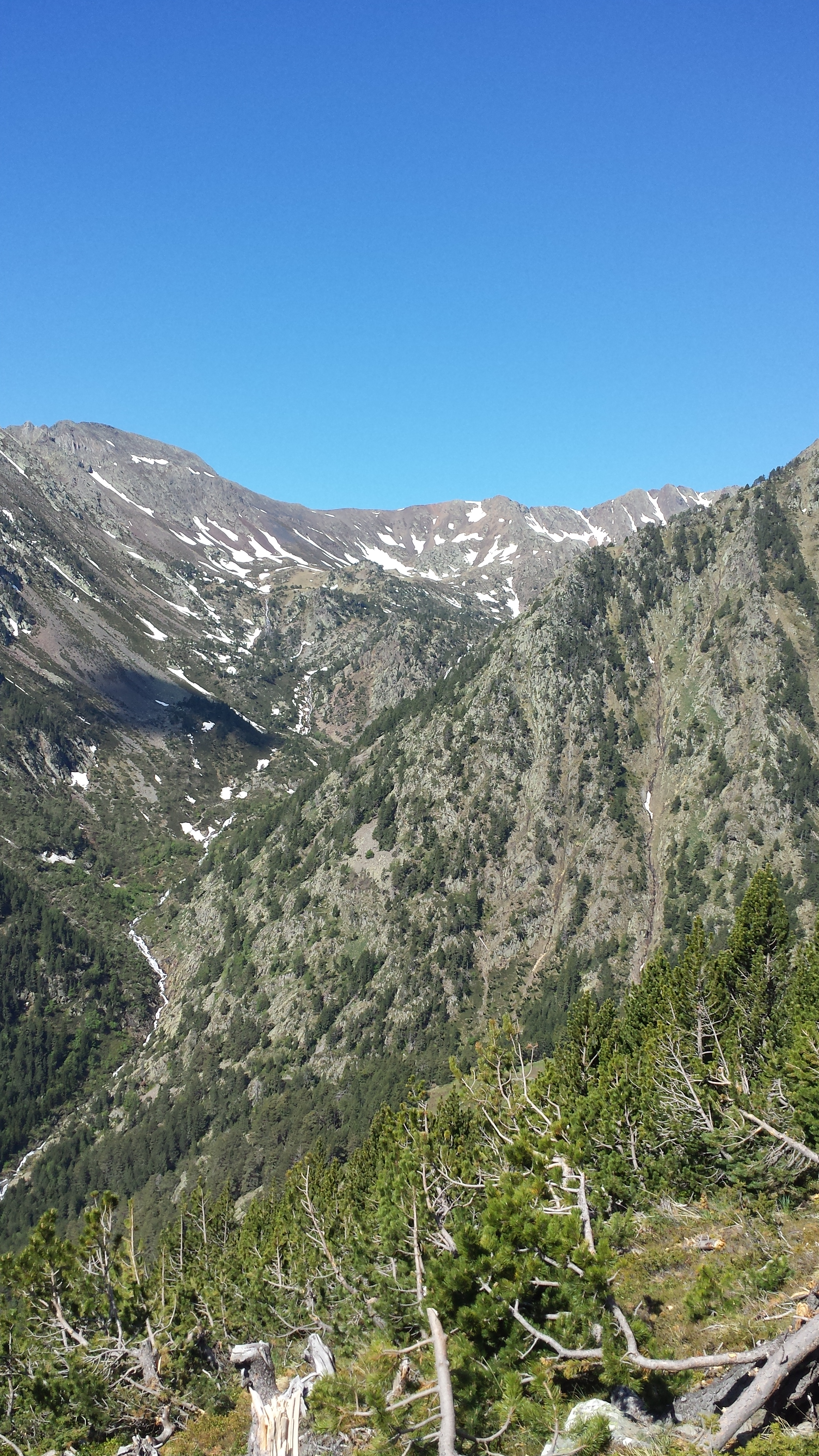
View of the Valleys of Coma Pedrosa.

=== Physical geography ===
The parish has an area of 65 square kilometres (25 sq mi), and adjoins the neighbouring parishes of Ordino, Encamp, Escaldes-Engordany, and Andorra la Vella, and also France (Occitanie) and Spain (Catalonia). There is 262 hectares (650 acres) of agricultural land, 14% of the total agricultural land in Andorra.

The main villages are La Massana (the capital city itself), Pal, Arinsal, Anyós, Erts, Sispony, L'Aldosa, and Escàs. Other settlements are Xixerella, Mas de Ribafeta, El Pui, and Puiol del Piu.

Coma Pedrosa in the north-west of the parish is the highest point in the Principality of Andorra at 2,942 metres (9,652 ft), and has panoramic views of the Pyrenees. The mountain is also the site of the Coma Pedrosa Nature Reserve. It is covered by heavy snowfalls in winter, and usually retains some snow cover in summer. The four next-highest peaks are Medacorba (2914 m), Sanfonts (2888 m), Pla de l'Estany (2859 m), and Racofred (2837 m). The town of La Massana has an average elevation of 1,240 metres (4,070 ft) above sea-level. There are four lakes: Forcats, Montmantell, Estany Negre, and Les Truites Lake.

The parish has three main rivers. The Valira del Nord, which begins at the Llac de Tristaina, is a 14-kilometre (8.7 mi) long tributary of the Gran Valira. There are also the Pal and the Montaner.

The mountains have rough pastures with numerous native species of Pyrenean wildflowers, and extensive forests of pines, firs, birches, wild cherries, and oaks.

=== Climate ===
The average annual temperature of La Massana town is 8 °C (46 °F). Across the whole parish, the climate varies greatly with elevation. Regions above the Alpine tree line at about 2100–2400 m have an alpine climate and alpine tundra. The valleys have a milder climate that is essentially temperate.

== Economy ==
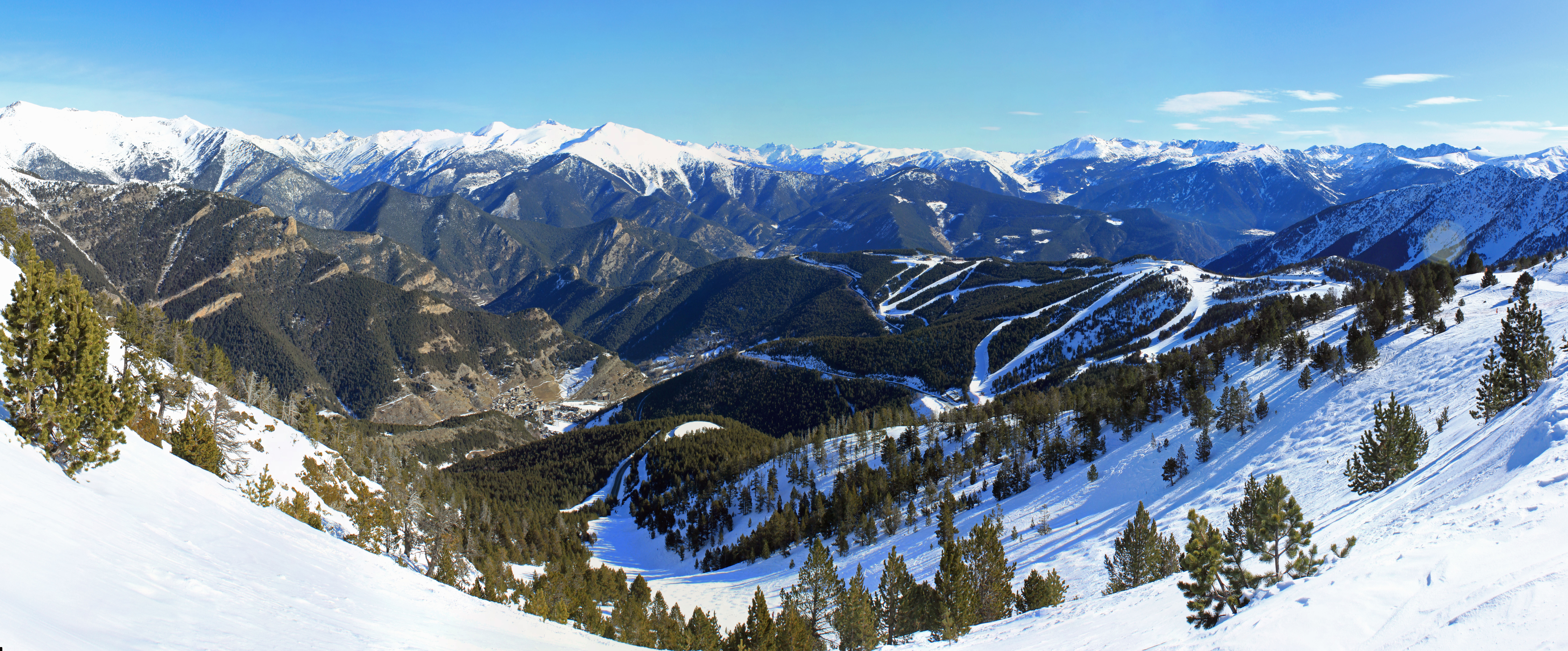
A panoramic view from Arinsal of Vallnord.

=== Tourism ===
The main industry is tourism and the parish is a major tourism destination. In winter, the main activities are skiing, snowboarding, and ski biking. The main ski resort, Vallnord, includes the Arinsal and Pal sectors, which jointly have 89 km of runs ranging in altitude from 2600 m to 1550 m. In summer, the main activities are hiking, climbing, mountain biking, 4x4 trails, and canyoning.

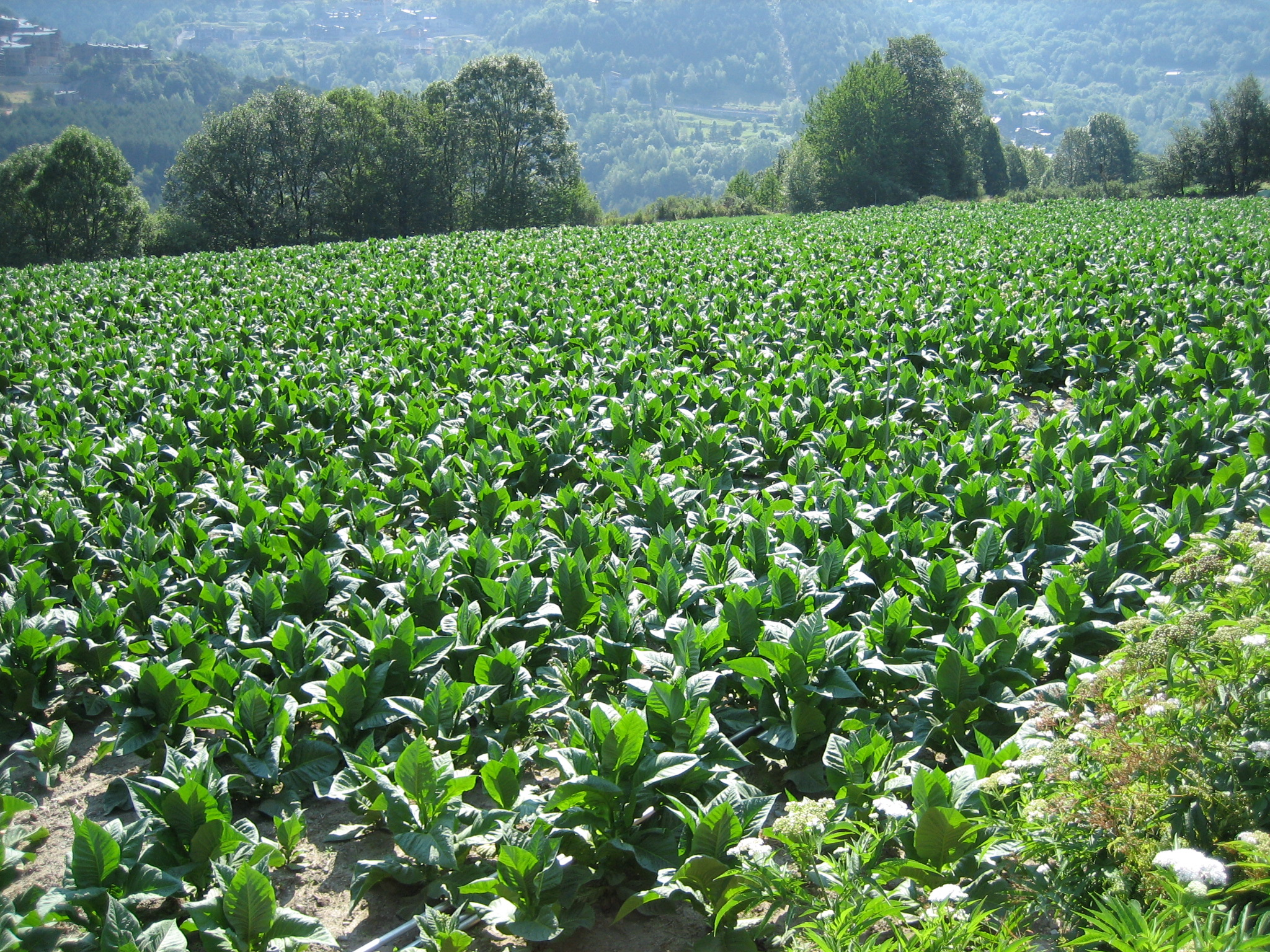
A field of tobacco plants in Sispony.

=== Agriculture ===
Agricultural land amounting to 262 ha is used for growing tobacco, vegetables (mainly potatoes), and cereals. There are rough pastures on the higher slopes which are used for raising dairy cattle and also for keeping horses used in trekking holidays.

=== Construction and real estate ===
The construction industry and real estate have also been significant sectors of the economy.

== Sights and culture ==
There are two museums: Casa Rull Ethnographic Museum in Sispony, and Farga Rossell, a forge built in the mid-19th century which has demonstrations of iron working.

The parish is host to a number of fiestas and other public celebrations. There are the festa patronale on 17 November, the festa major on 15 August, and the Rosary fete on the second Sunday of July. A fiesta is also held at the end of June or beginning of July, depending on the weather, to mark the consecration of the livestock and pastures.

== Transport ==
The transport infrastructure consists of roads, road tunnels, gondola lifts, and two heliports. There are no railways, ports, airports, or navigable waterways.

=== Buses ===
There are regular bus services throughout the rural and metropolitan areas of the parish. There are services to most destinations inside Andorra and several long-distance services to destinations outside Andorra such as Barcelona and Toulouse.

=== Road infrastructure ===
The parish is linked to the neighbouring parish of Ordino by the CG-3 main road, and to the capital, Andorra La Vella, by the CG-3/CG-4 main road.

There are two road tunnels along the route of the CG-3/CG-4: the Pont Pla Tunnel, a 1.3-kilometre (0.8 mi) long tunnel built in 2006, and the Sant Antoni Tunnel, a 280-metre (306 yd) long tunnel built in 2003. The Pont Pla Tunnel has been designated the best and safest tunnel in Europe by the European Tunnels Assessment Programme (EuroTAP).

The parish's road network is being upgraded in a multimillion-euro programme involving new tunnel construction, road widening, improved sign-posting, new bicycle lanes, and additional safety measures such as crash barriers and signal-controlled pedestrian crossings.

The Dos Valires Tunnel, a road tunnel between Anyós and Encamp, was completed in 2012, cutting the expected journey times from the current 30–45 minutes to 5 minutes.

=== Heliports ===
There are two heliports in the area — one in La Massana town (the Heliport Terra Guindaldes) and one in Arinsal, both providing commercial helicopter services. In addition, there is a heliport in the capital, Andorra la Vella Heliport. There are no scheduled passenger flights to these heliports, but it is possible to book taxi flights from Barcelona, Lleida, Perpignan, or Toulouse airports for fixed prices. There is no airport in Andorra. The nearest one is Andorra–La Seu d'Urgell Airport in Spain around 12 km from the border.

=== Gondola lifts ===
There is a gondola lift linking the town of La Massana to Vallnord (Pal-Arinsal sector ski station); it runs throughout the year. There are further gondola lifts within the ski resorts themselves.

== Notable people ==
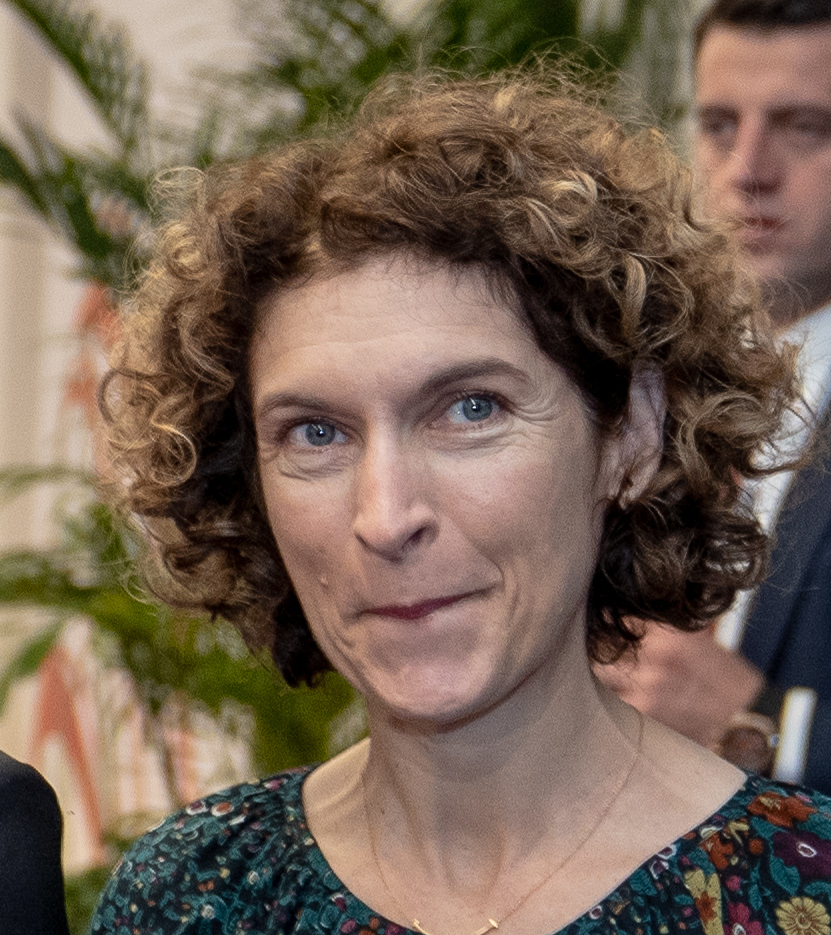
Maria Ubach i Font, 2018

- Antoni Garrallà, mayor from 1995 to 2003.
- Siegfried Grabner (born 1975, in Waiern, Carinthia, Austria) is an Austrian professional snowboarder, competed in the 2006 Winter Olympics. He now lives in La Massana.
- Josep Gómes (born 3 December 1985 in La Massana), international footballer who plays as a goalkeeper.
- Enzo Joulié (born 17 May 2004 in Cournonsec, France), French racing driver
- Philippe Shangti (born 1983 in Toulouse, France), is a contemporary artist who lives and works in La Massana. He represent the Principality of Andorra at the 58th Venice Biennale with his project "The Future is Now".
- Maria Ubach i Font (born 14 June 1973 in La Massana), former Minister of Foreign Affairs of Andorra.
- Ester Molné Soldevila (born 21 January 1977 in La Massa), current Minister of Justice and Interior
- Roger Vidosa (born 1984 in La Massana), alpine skier, he competed at the 2006 Winter Olympics and at the 2010 Winter Olympics.
