= Coma Pedrosa =

Highest point in Andorra

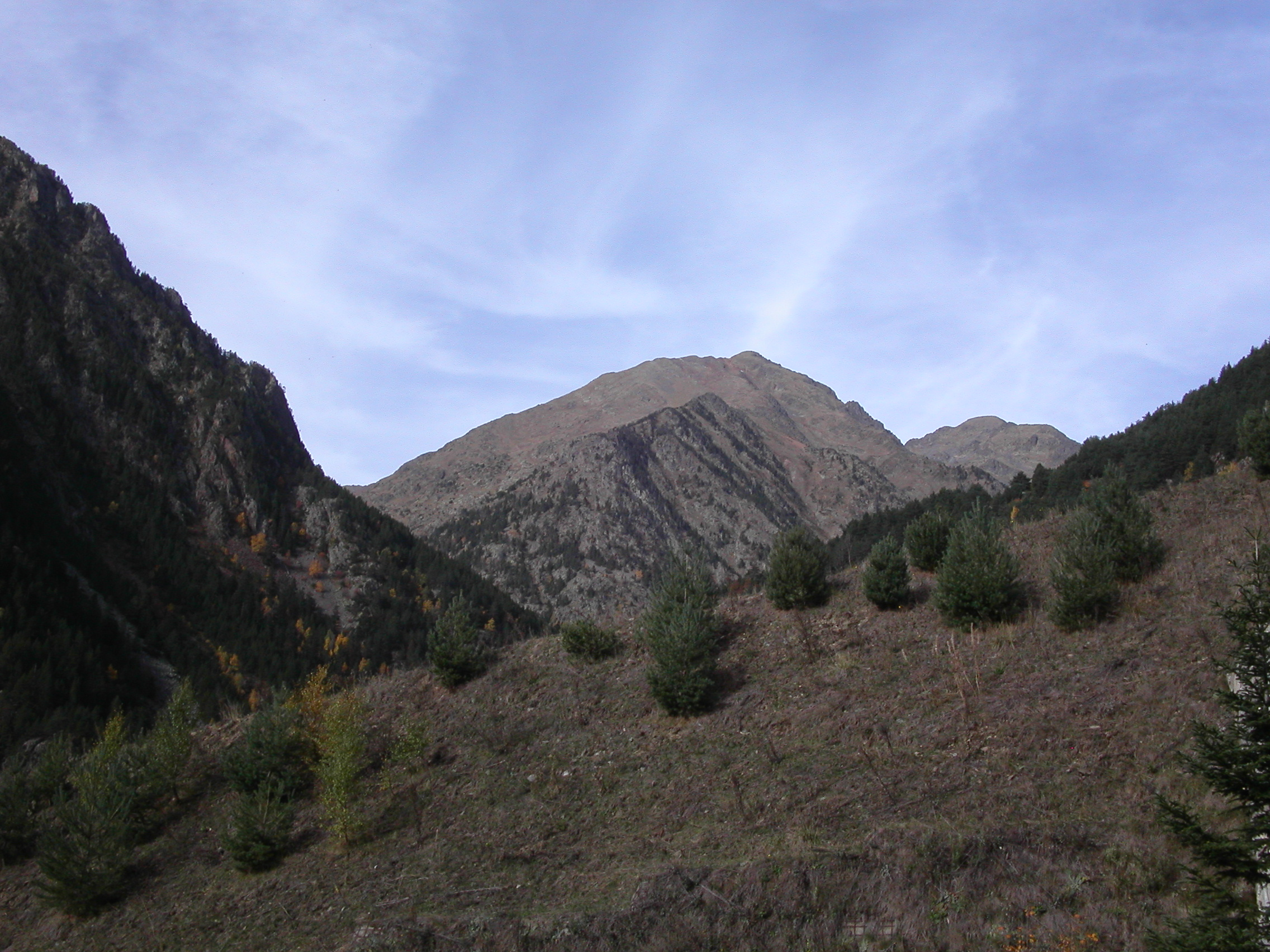
- Coma Pedrosa in October 2006

Highest point
- Elevation: 2,943 m (9,656 ft)
- Prominence: 434 m (1,424 ft)
- Listing: Country high point
- Coordinates: 42°35′26″N 1°26′41.21″E

Geography
- Location within Andorra
- Location: Parish of La Massana, Andorra
- Parent range: Pyrenees

Coma Pedrosa (Catalan pronunciation: [ˈkomə pəˈðɾozə]; 2,943 m or 9,656 ft) is the highest mountain in Andorra. It is popular with mountain climbers, its ascent being technically straightforward, although strenuous. From Arinsal to Camp de Refuge (650 m climb) is considered moderate meanwhile the last 862 m is considered to be difficult. Several mountain lakes and tarns are found on the slopes, including Estanys de Baiau, which lies on the western slopes, across the Spanish border.

The nearest town is Arinsal, La Massana. Historically, the mountain provided ample security from invasions into Andorra. The mountain is part of the Parc Natural Comunal de les Valls del Comapedrosa national park.

== Geography ==
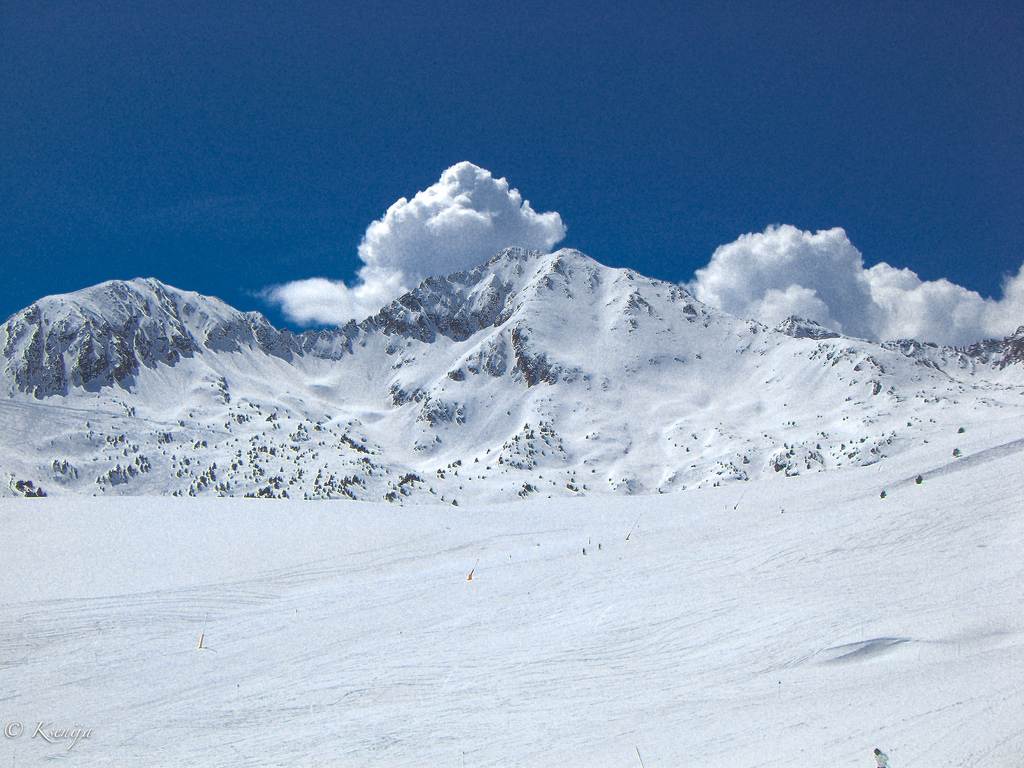
Snow-covered Andorra mountains

Coma Pedrosa, shaped like a pyramid, is situated at the northwestern border with France and Spain. It has in the past acted as a barrier between Andorra and France. The mountainous terrain of Andorra, a landlocked country, contains 65 peaks that rise to an elevation of greater than 2,000 m (6,562 ft). Coma Pedrosa is the highest, at 2,943 m (9,656 ft).

The higher reaches of the mountain are covered with forests, while the lower reaches have some arable lands. The mountain gets fully covered with snow during the winter months which provides opportunities for skiing and mountaineering, ice climbing and scrambling. During the summer season, the mountain provides many easy routes for trekking through the Arinsal valley covering neighbouring areas of Vall Ferrera in Spain after crossing the mountain pass Baiau.

The local area is known as Comapedrosa. The mountain is in a natural park called Parque Natural Comunal de los Valles del Comapedrosa (Communal natural park of the Comapedrosa valleys).

=== Vegetation ===
The forest vegetation on the mountain and in its valleys are of pines, birch and firs. There are several glacial lakes formed within the valley created by the mountains. The popularity of skiing has led to an increase in the development of tourist resorts, hotels, restaurants and business establishments catering to tourists in the region. This has created an awareness to preserve virgin mountains and forests, and put restrictions on further proliferation of ski resorts and urban activities by introducing a national network of parks as preserves.

== Climate ==
Coma Pedrosa is classified as a subalpine climate (Dfc), due to fewer than four months with an average temperature above 10°C (50°F).

Climate data for Coma Pedrosa (1971–2000)
Month	Jan	Feb	Mar	Apr	May	Jun	Jul	Aug	Sep	Oct	Nov	Dec	Year
Mean daily maximum °C (°F)	1.2 (34.2)	1.8 (35.2)	3.5 (38.3)	4.3 (39.7)	8.6 (47.5)	13.0 (55.4)	18.1 (64.6)	18.1 (64.6)	14.4 (57.9)	9.0 (48.2)	5.3 (41.5)	2.8 (37.0)	5.4 (41.7)
Daily mean °C (°F)	−2.0 (28.4)	−1.7 (28.9)	−0.2 (31.6)	0.4 (32.7)	4.0 (39.2)	7.6 (45.7)	11.6 (52.9)	12.0 (53.6)	9.1 (48.4)	4.9 (40.8)	1.2 (34.2)	−0.4 (31.3)	1.7 (35.1)
Mean daily minimum °C (°F)	−4.7 (23.5)	−5.0 (23.0)	−4.0 (24.8)	−3.5 (25.7)	−0.6 (30.9)	2.3 (36.1)	5.2 (41.4)	5.2 (41.4)	2.9 (37.2)	0.1 (32.2)	−2.5 (27.5)	−4.0 (24.8)	−1.7 (28.9)
Average precipitation mm (inches)	86.3 (3.40)	65.3 (2.57)	70.2 (2.76)	117.5 (4.63)	134.8 (5.31)	133.2 (5.24)	88.6 (3.49)	112.3 (4.42)	112.1 (4.41)	114.8 (4.52)	113.9 (4.48)	106.5 (4.19)	1,255.5 (49.42)
Source: ACDA

== Tourism ==
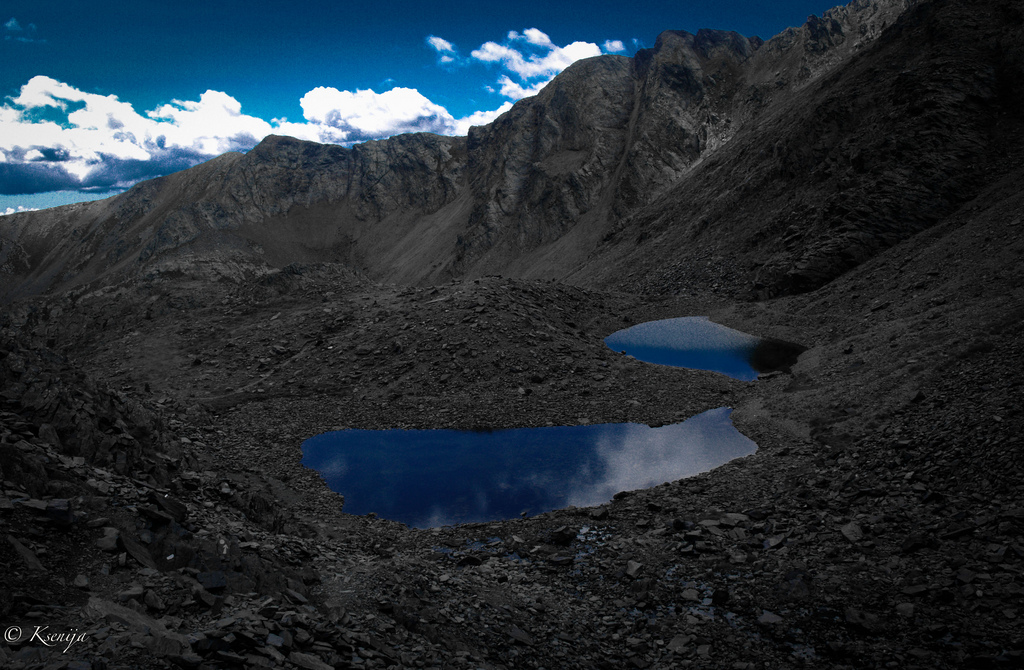
Way to the top of Andorra

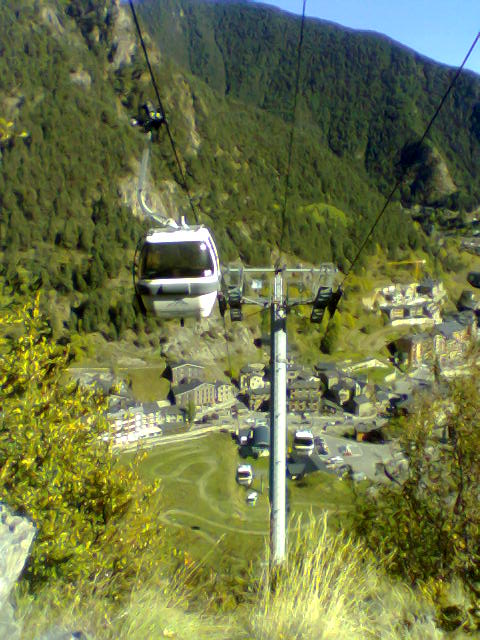
Cable car station at Arinsal

The trek to the summit of Coma Pedrosa starts from a picnic area at the base of the Ribal Warefall at 1,580 metres (5,180 ft). The Coma Pedrosa refuge and camping site, at an elevation 2,272 metres (7,454 ft), is located near the l'Estany de les Truites (Trout Lake). The trail then leads to the Estany Negre (Black Lake), named on account of its colour. From Estany Negre to the summit, the trail is steep and rocky.

In the Arinsal valley below the Coma Pedrosa, winter season offers skiing and snowboarding. The first ski lifts were installed in Arinsal in 1973. It is ten kilometres (six miles) northwest of Andorra la Vella and five kilometres (three miles) northwest of Massana, providing a pleasant après-ski sight. At an elevation of 2,260 metres (7,410 ft) lies Refugi de Coma Pedrosa, a mountain hut. It was inaugurated in 1992.
