= Sergio Rodríguez López-Ros =

Spanish academician and diplomat

Ambassador Sergio Rodríguez y López-Ros IdE OIC OCM
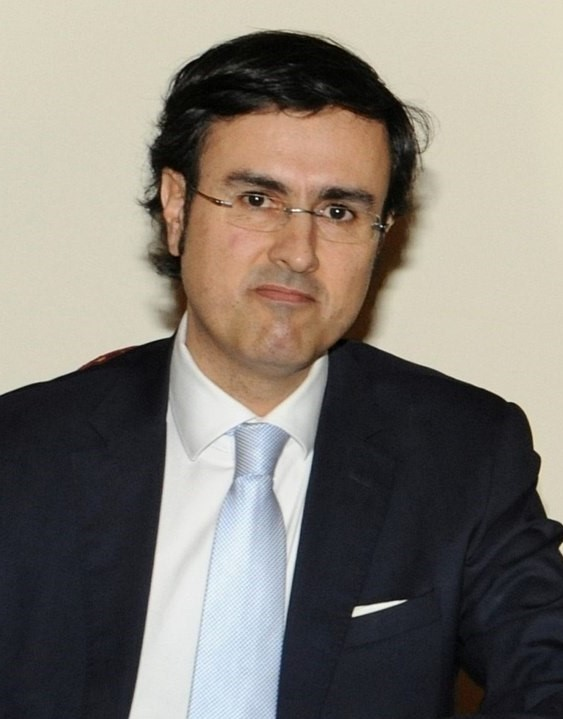
- Rodríguez López-Ros in 2019

Ambassador Extraordinary and Plenipotentiary to Principality of Andorra
- Incumbent
- Assumed office 6 August 2025

Personal details
- Born: 21 November 1970 (age 55) Barcelona, Spain
- Children: 1
- Education: Salesian College of Sarrià
- Alma mater: Autonomous University of Barcelona (PhD)
- Occupation: Academician

Sergio Rodríguez y López-Ros IdE OIC OCM (born 21 November 1970) is a Spanish academic, former member of the Spanish Foreign Serveign. Currently he serves in Foreign Service of the Sovereign Military Order of Malta as Ambassador to the Principality of Andorra.

== Education ==
Rodríguez was born in Barcelona to a Portuguese family that settled in Spain in the 18th century.

He studied at the Salesian College of Sarrià with future cardinal Cristóbal López Romero before graduating with a degree in communication at the Autonomous University of Barcelona. He later took a specialized course at the Menéndez Pelayo International University.

He earned a PhD at the Ramon Llull University, with a doctoral court chaired by Artur Juncosa Carbonell on the philosophical approach to the identity of people of gypsy culture. Finally he specialized in the London School of Economics and the Massachusetts Institute of Technology.

Rodriguez served in the Spanish Arapiles Regiment, twinned with the British Royal Lancers, for which he received the badge of Honorary Member of that British Armed Forces unit, as well as the Distinguished Services Diploma of the Spanish Armed Forces. He later interned with the organizing committee for the 1992 Summer Olympics, where he received the Olympic Volunteer Medal.

== Career ==
Rodriguez was the director of two centres of the Instituto Cervantes, serving in the Spanish embassies to Italy, San Marino, Albania and Malta, and temporary coordinator of a third one., serving in the Spanish Consulate General in Milano. He also served as a coordinator of the House for a City of Knowledge within the City Council of Barcelona.

Rodriguez has been a consultant of the EU bodies EACEA, TAIEX and REA, as well as a member of researches for the European Council and the European Parliament. He participated in one of the feasibility reports of the FRA and in the forums of the Holy See, the IDEA, the Aspen Institute, the COMECE, the Club of Rome and the OMAEC (World Organisation of Former Pupils of Catholic Education).

Rodríguez was the architect of the bilateral agreements on the Instituto Cervantes between the Kingdom of Spain and the Holy See, Italy, San Marino and the Sovereign Order of Malta, as well as the opening of a Spanish centre in Albania. In 2000, Rodriguez aided in the search of Roma people in Spain to be compensated by the Swiss Bankers Association for having been forcibly employed by companies during Nazism, and also in the protection of Roma families from Kosovo who had taken refuge on the Greek border. He also contributed to the transfer from Spain to the Netherlands of the Command Baton of William I of Orange.

Rodriguez served in the Sovereign Order of Malta embassies to Albania and Andorra. He was the first appointed Techno Diplomat (2020) and the architect of the bilateral relations between the Sovereign Order of Malta and the Principality of Andorra (2025).

He is currently ambassador-consultant of the Spanish–Portuguese foundation Fundação Rei Afonso Henriques and a member of the Advisory Council of the Fundación Pere Closa, the Xarxa Vives d'Universitats, and the Scientific Committee of the public magazine Mediterráneo. He served as Pro-Rector of the Universitat Abat Oliba CEU of Barcelona.

Rodriguez is one of the sectorial directors of the Spanish forum Cursos de La Granda.

== Community involvement ==
Committed philanthropist, Rodriguez supports many entities, especially regarding youngsters. Rodríguez is also committed to rural development in the Portugal-Spain border area.

Rodriguez has participated in research, both in public and private universities around Europe, primarily in intercultural and interfaith dialogue among those in the Groupe de Recherche Islamo-Chretien. He has been involved in the design of policies that are inclusive towards minorities in the European Union and encourage the involvement of minorities in European society. He is a foremost expert on the Roma people in Europe.

An author of several essays and history books, he is correspondent fellow of the Royal Academy of History and of the Academy of Sciences of Bologna. He has been distinguished with public decorations, both national and international, among others the Order of the Social Solidarity awarded by H.M. King Felipe VI of Spain.

He has written articles on geopolitics and geoeconomics in La Vanguardia, The Diplomat, Revista de Política Exterior, and Cuadernos Hispanoamericanos.

== Personal life ==
Rodriguez's family seat is in Alcañices, in the county of Aliste, closed to the Portuguese border, once abandoned the previous one in the county of the Castle of Algoso in the 18th century.

Among his ancestors are Pablo Muñoz de la Morena, Tomás Pellicer, Roque López, and José Rodríguez, who was declared two times Meritorious of the Homeland (1860 and 1876) by the Spanish Parliament. His grandfather Melchor received the Medal of the Royal National Lifeboat Institution for helping another castaway in a shipwrecked at the Atlantic.

His family received the Spanish legacy of opera singer Conchita Supervia, married in London to Ben Rubenstein.

== Decorations ==
Apart from foreign honours, for his services he has been distinguished with these Spanish decorations:

- Knight Commander with Star of the Order of the Solidarity
- Knight Official of the Order of Isabella the Catholic
- Knight Official of the Order of Civil Merit
- Cross with Star of the National Gendarmerie
- Cross of the Spanish Army
- Cross of the National Police
- Medal of the V Centenary of the Spanish Artillery
- Medal of the Centenary of the National Gendarmerie
