= Artur Juncosa Carbonell =

Spanish philosopher and Jesuit priest (1925-2010)

The Reverend Artur Juncosa Carbonell SJ
- Born: 5 October 1925; Les Borges del Camp, Spain
- Died: 13 December 2010 (aged 85); Barcelona, Spain

Education
- Education: University of Barcelona
- Doctoral advisor: José Ignacio Alcorta Echevarría

Philosophical work
- Era: 20th-century philosophy
- Region: Western philosophy
- School: Christian philosophy; Sociology of knowledge
- Main interests: Sociology of knowledge
- Notable works: La Sociología del conocimiento en Karl Mannheim (1975)

Signature
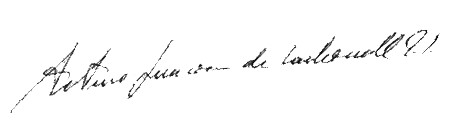

Artur Juncosa Carbonell SJ; 5 October 1925 – 13 December 2010) was a Spanish Jesuit priest, philosopher, who specialized in epistemology and axiology. He stood out for his works on the sociology of knowledge and categorical translation. He was an active intellectual in the fight for democracy in Spain.

== Early years ==
Juncosa was born in Les Borges del Camp (Tarragona), into a traditionalist family. He studied engineering in Madrid and graduated in philosophy (1952) and in Theology (1956) from the Faculty of San Francisco de Borja and from the University of Barcelona (1958), where he received his PhD in 1979.

In 1946 he entered the Society of Jesus, being assigned to the prestigious Chemical Institute of Sarrià. He was ordained a priest in 1955.

== Academic activity ==
He worked as a teacher at the Chemical Institute of Sarrià (1957-1962), the University of Barcelona (1959-1991), the University of Seville (1981-1983) and the University of Barcelona (1983-1991), where he was professor of Ethics and Sociology.

In 1971, Dr José Ignacio Alcorta Echevarría, Professor of Ethics at the University of Barcelona, supervised his PhD thesis "The Sociology of Knowledge in Karl Mannheim", which received the City of Barcelona Prize in 1971.

He was director of the Department of Philosophy, Theory and Practice of the University of Barcelona and delegate rector of the university faculties of the University of Barcelona in Tarragona from 1973 to 1978.

He was visiting professor at numerous universities in Europe, including the Pontifical Gregorian University in Rome, and in America, where he taught courses and gave lectures.

He was one of the promoters of the Universitat Ramon Llull (1990) and the University of Rovira i Virgili (1991), in his capacity as deputy rector of the university faculties of the University of Barcelona in Tarragona (1973–78). Being in turn one of the promoters. He was University Defender of the University of Barcelona (1993-1998) and of the University Ramon Llull (2004-2008).

== Research activity ==
Author of numerous scientific articles and several books, he was a member of the Fundació Catalana per a la Recerca, of the Board of Trustees of the Chemical Institute of Sarrià, vice-president of the Borja Institute of Bioethics (integrated into the health complex of the Sant Joan de Déu Hospital of Barcelona), member of the Advisory Council of the Barcelona Institute of Technoethics and of the Advisory Council of INEHCA. In 1993 he was appointed rector of the Borja Center in Sant Cugat del Vallés. Also, he was a founding member of the Catalan Society of Philosophy of the Institute for Catalan Studies; the Center d'Estudis Carles Cardó and the Jacques Maritain International Institute.

Throughout his teaching career he directed numerous theses and presided over many PhD theses committees, including those of Josep M. Lozano Soler, Jordi Giró París, Norbert Bilbeny García, Begoña Román Maestre and Sergio Rodríguez López-Ros.

Upon his death, following his will, his body was given to science, as a way to continue contributing to scientific knowledge even after his death.

== Political engagement ==
In 1945, due to his Carlim militancy against Francisco Franco, he was sent to prison as a result of the events of the Carlist Circle of Pamplona, which ended in clashes with the forces of public order, with hundreds of detainees and the closure of multiple Carlist premises.

Around 1950 he began his close relationship with the Bourbon-Parma family and on many occasions he visited Puchheim castle to meet Prince Xavier of Bourbon-Parma and Carlos Hugo, Duke of Parma, of whom he became a confessor. He attended the wedding of Carlos Hugo, Duke of Parma and Princess Irene of the Netherlands in Rome in 1964, accompanied by a large part of the Tuna (music) from the Colegio Mayor Loyola in Barcelona.

He actively participated, as a Carlist, in the anti-Franco struggle, with clandestine meetings, courses and seminars in Spain, and in Perpignan, Arbonne and other towns in the south of France.

His firm attitude at the time he assumed the direction of the delegation in Tarragona of the University of Barcelona, brought him problems with the civil government and the police, who prevented his presence in the university premises. An activity with which he played, on a daily basis, his position at the university and that created prestige for him among teachers and students.

He was the promoter of the Assembly of Catalonia, and together with Carlos Feliu de Travy, they proposed the points that were accepted by the rest of the organizations that made it up. He also actively participated in the Consell de Forces Politiques and the Platajunta Democrática. These movements, with the support of Carlos Hugo, Duke of Parma, contributed to the establishment of democracy in Spain.

== Awards ==
- Premio Ciudad de Barcelona (1971)
- Order of Prohibited Legitimacy (1996)
- Order of Saint Louis for Civil Merit (1997)
- Parmese Sacred Military Constantinian Order of Saint George (1999)
- Order of the Holy Sepulchre (2006)
