= Pablo Muñoz =

Pablo Muñoz may refer to:

- Pablo Muñoz de la Morena (1769-1848), Spanish commander
- Pablo Muñoz Vega (1903-1994), Ecuadorian Roman Catholic prelate and cardinal
- Pablo Muñoz (footballer) (born 2003), Spanish footballer
- Pablo Muñoz (ice hockey), player for the Spain national team at events such as the 2018 Winter Olympics
