= IQS =

IQs is the plural form of intelligence quotient.

IQS or IQs can also refer to:

- Chemical Institute of Sarrià (Catalan: Institut Químic de Sarrià, Spanish: Instituto Químico de Sarriá), an institute with the two schools IQS School of Engineering and IQS School of Management
- Incident Qualification System, a software developed by the U.S. National Association of State Foresters
- Initial Quality Study, an annual automotive industry study which measures problems experienced within the first 90 days of ownership, with a lower number meaning fewer experienced problems
