= Josep María Comelles =

Spanish anthropologist and physician

Josep M.Comelles (Josep Maria Comelles Esteban)
- Born: 21 October 1949 (age 76); Barcelona
- Education: 1. University of Barcelona in MD; 2. School for Advanced Studies in the Social Sciences in PhD
- Scientific career
- Fields: Medical Anthropology; Psychiatry
- Workplaces: University of Rovira i Virgili

Josep M. Comelles (born, 1949) is a Spanish anthropologist and physician. He is Professor Emeritus at the University of Rovira i Virgili.

== Biography ==
Comelles graduated in Medicine and Surgery from the University of Barcelona, received a Master of Science in Psychiatry from the Autonomous University of Barcelona and graduated with a Doctor of Philosophy (PhD) in Anthropology from the School for Advanced Studies in the Social Sciences.

== Selected publications ==
=== Book ===
1. Enfermedad, cultura y sociedad: un ensayo sobre las relaciones entre la antropología social y la medicina in Edições da Universidade Complutense de Madrid, 1993

=== Papers ===
1. Medical anthropologies in Europe | Antropologías médicas en Europa in Salud Colectiva Revista
2. Medical Anthropology in Spain: A historical perspective in Jahrbuch fur Europaische Ethnologie, 2014
