= Begoña Román Maestre =

Spanish philosopher

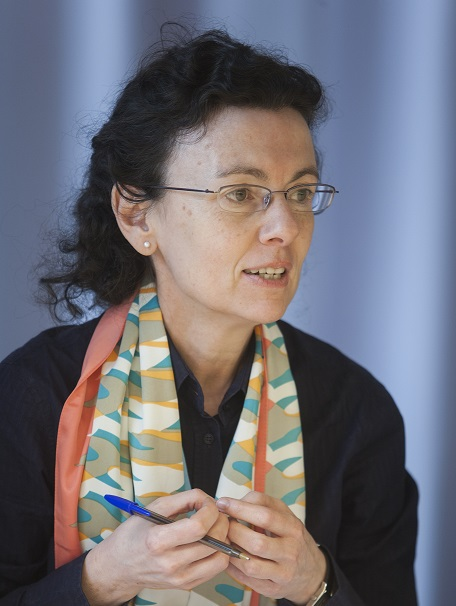
Begoña Román Maestre (2014)

Begoña Román Maestre (Petrer, 1965) is a Spanish philosopher, university professor, and researcher.

== Early life and education ==
Begoña Román was born in the town of Petrer, Province of Alicante. She received her PhD in philosophy from the University of Barcelona in 1993 with a thesis entitled La Comunidad humana en la filosofía práctica de I. Kant under the direction of Artur Juncosa Carbonell.

== Career and research ==
She was a professor at Ramon Llull University and director of the Chair of Ethics at the same university (1996–2007). Beginning in 2021, she became a professor at the University of Barcelona. She has supervised seventeen doctoral theses.

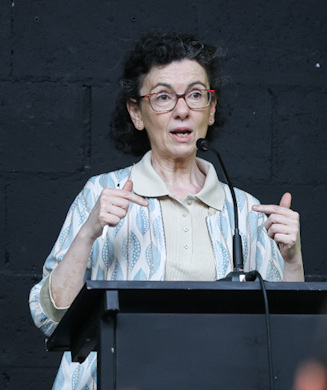
At Social Lab 2023

Roman Maestre is a member of the consolidated research group Aporía: Filosofía contemporánea, Ética y Política (Aporía: Contemporary Philosophy, Ethics and Politics). Her area of specialization is ethics applied to professional and organizational environments, where she teaches at the university and provides training in institutions. She chairs the Ethics Committee of the Servicios Sociales de Cataluña (Social Services of Catalonia) and is a member of the Comité de Bioética de Cataluña (Bioethics Committee of Catalonia).

In addition to some fifty articles in specialized journals, some of her more current publications include Ética en los servicios sociales (Herder, 2016) and, together with Francisco Esteban, ¿Quo vadis, Universidad? (UOC, 2016). She has coordinated Hacia una sociedad responsable: reflexiones desde las éticas aplicadas, (Prohom Edicions, 2006), Por una ética ecológica (Prohom Edicions, 2005) and Por una ética docente (Prohom Edicions, 2003). With Josep Maria Esquirol Calaf, she served as co-editor of La confidencialidad en la salud mental de la era digital (2017) and Diagnóstico en salud mental: una aproximación ética (2016).

== Selected works ==
=== Books ===
- Román, B. (2016). Ética de los Servicios Sociales. Ed. Herder. ISBN 978-84-254-3787-8
- Esteban, F & Román, B. (2106): ¿Quo vadis, Universidad?. Universitat Oberta de Catalunya, ISBN 978-84-911-6390-9

=== Book chapters ===
- Román, B. (2021). Violencia obstétrica: reflexiones desde la ética, A VVAA, Hot topics en ginecología y obstetricia, (pp. 25 – 31). Ediciones Permanyer. ISBN 978-84-18673-49-8.
- Román, B. (2021). Adolescencias: una mirada desde la ética, A Cruz, D; Mollejo, E; González, F (Coords.). Adolescencias. Nuevos retos nuevas transiciones (pp. 57–60). Asociación Española de Neuropsiquiatría Estudios. 64. ISBN 978-84-95287-49-6
- Román, B. (2021). Una pedagogía de la bioética pedagógica. A Terribas, N. & Busquets, E. Pedagogía de la bioètica (pp. 21–30). Lectio Ediciones. ISBN 978-84-16918-94-2.
- Román, B (2018). El reconocimiento mutuo: por una ética de los servicios sociales A García-Marza, V; Martínez, E; y Lozano J.F (coords) Ética y política. Homenaje a Adela Cortina (pp. 383–294. )Tecnos. ISBN 978-84-309-7404-7
