= Universitat d'Andorra =

University in Sant Julià de Lòria, Andorra

Coordinates: 42°27′54″N 1°29′26″E

University of Andorra
- Universitat d'Andorra
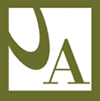
- University logo
- Type: Public University
- Established: 1988
- Affiliations: International Association of Universities, European University Association (EUA), Agence Universitaire de la Francophonie, Universia, Vives Network
- Rector: Juli Minoves Triquell (since 2024)
- Administrative staff: 178
- Students: 1815 (2023)
- Location: Plaça de la Germandat, 7 AD600 - Sant Julià de Lòria, Sant Julià de Lòria, Andorra
- Website: www.uda.ad
- data from 2008

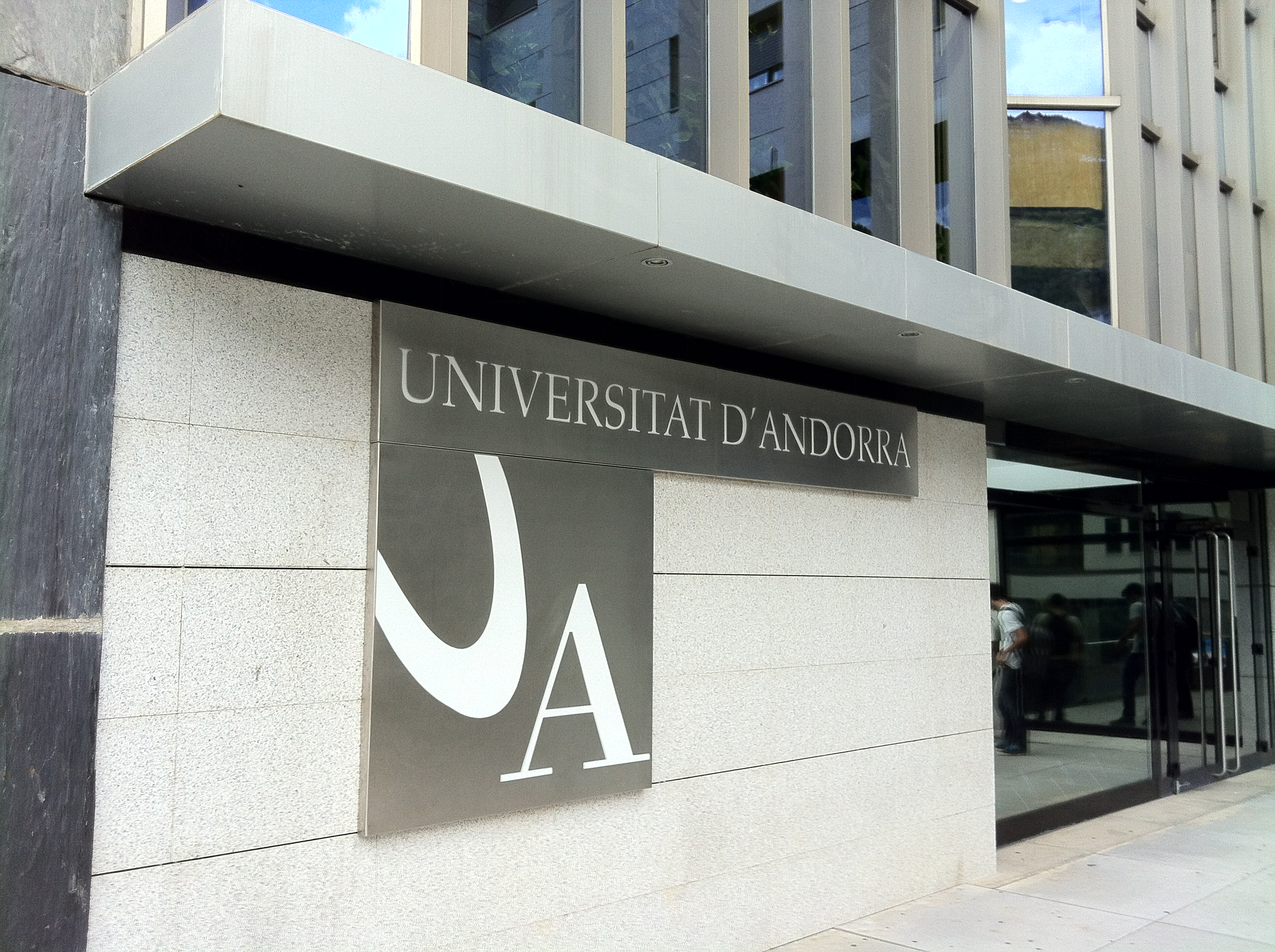
Universitat d'Andorra

The University of Andorra (Catalan: Universitat d'Andorra; IPA: [uniβəɾsiˈtad dənˈdorə]) is a public institution of higher education created in 1988, and the first university in Andorra. The university consists of the College of Health and Education Sciences, the College of Business and Technology, and the College of eLearning and Lifelong Learning.

The university is a member of the Vives Network, the European University Association, the International Association of Universities. As of 2018, approximately three-quarters of the university's finances came from Andorran state.

During the 2018–2019 academic year, the University of Andorra celebrated its 30th anniversary with the closure of a time capsule with documentation and everyday objects from the year 2018. The time capsule cannot be opened until the 2088–2089 academic year, coinciding with its centenary.
