= Juan Corona Ramón =

Doctor in Economic and Business Sciences and professor of Applied Economics

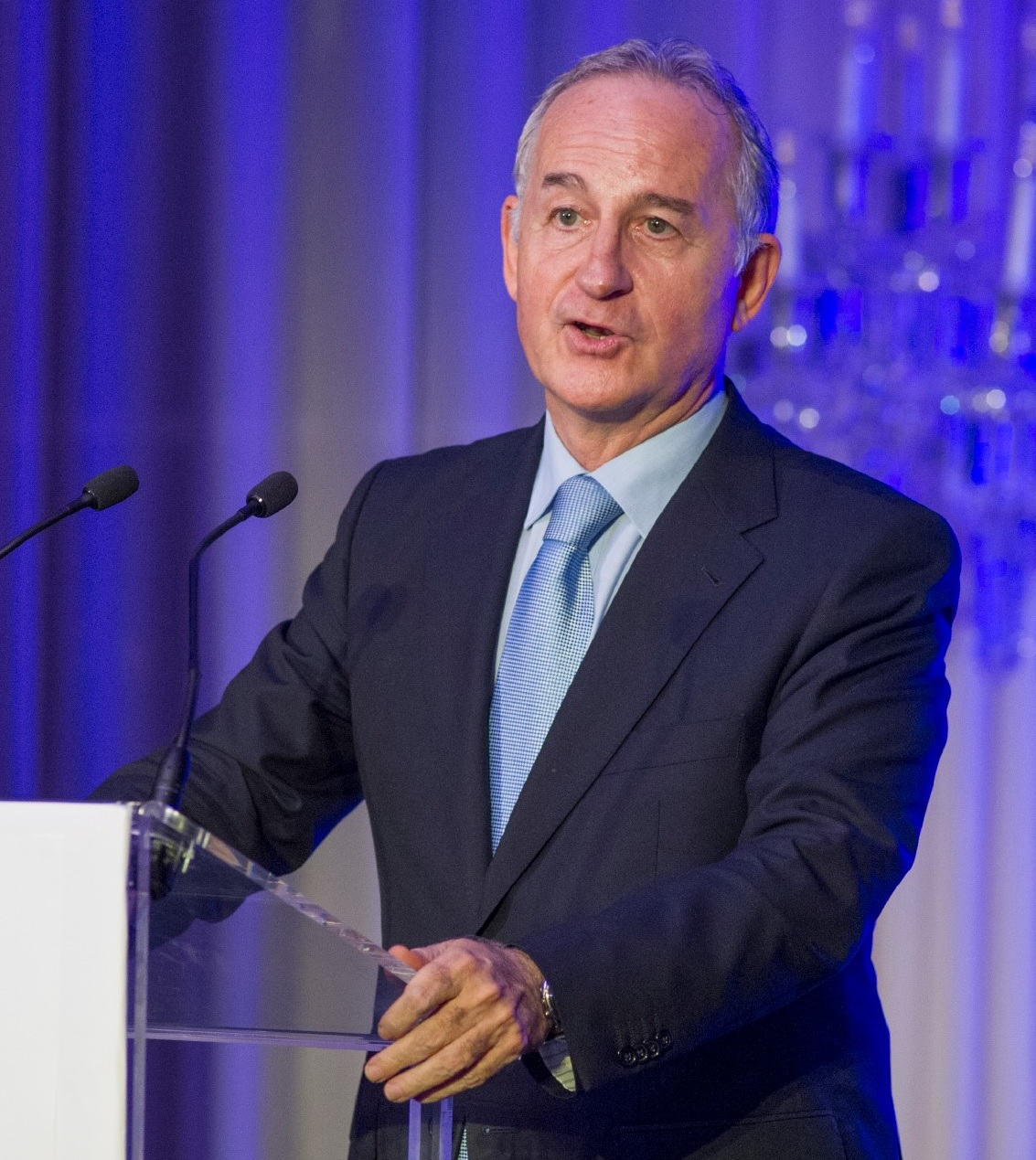
- Born: 1959 (age 66–67); Barcelona, Spain
- Education: University of Barcelona
- Scientific career
- Fields: Economics; Applied economics
- Workplaces: Abat Oliba CEU University

Juan Corona Ramón (born 1959) PhD in Economics and Business Sciences and Professor of Applied Economics. He was the first rector of Abat Oliba CEU University (UAO CEU), of which he is honorary rector. He currently directs the Jean Monnet Chair on Fiscal Integration in the European Union and the Antoni de Montserrat Chair of World Studies, both at UAO CEU.

== Education ==
Degree in Economics and Business Sciences from the University of Barcelona (1982), with Extraordinary Honours, and PhD in Economics and Business Sciences from the University of Barcelona (1984) with Extraordinary Honours.

== Career ==
He has served as a member of the European Court of Auditors, General Director of the Instituto de la Empresa Familiar, and is a member, among others, of the Board of Directors of Sociedad de Estudios Económicos, of the Spanish Association of Executives. He is also Director of Red de Cátedras de Empresa Familiar (which includes 38 Spanish universities).

He also serves on numerous boards, boards of trustees and editorial committees, including the European Journal of Family Business, and Economist & Jurist. He directs the Family Business Collection of Ediciones Deusto. He is a member of the Board of Directors of the Catalonia-Africa Institute and president of the Institute of North American Studies. An expert in tax policy, he was a member of the Commission of Experts for the Reform of the Spanish Tax System, chaired by Manuel Lagares. He is currently a member of the Group of Tax Experts, created by Foment del Treball.

== Academic and research activity ==
In 1993, he won the Chair of Applied Economics, Political Economics and Public Finance at the University of the Balearic Islands. He directed the Department of Economics at the University from 1993 to 1997. In 1997, he took up the Chair of Applied Economics at the International University of Catalonia, and was Dean of the Faculty of Economics and Business Studies from 1997 to 2001.

In 2001, he was appointed rector of Abat Oliba CEU University, achieving its official recognition and acting as its first Rector between 2001 and 2004. In the same year, he was appointed honorary rector of the University.

At Abat Oliba CEU University, he also serves as Professor of Applied Economics, Honorary Director of the Chair of Business Creation and Family Business, Director of the Antoni de Montserrat Chair of World Studies, and Director of the Jean Monnet Chair of European Fiscal Integration.

He is a member of 42 National and 18 International Scientific and Professional Associations. He has collaborated with more than 50 national and 22 foreign universities, including the following: Harvard, Kiel and The Sorbonne. He has presented papers and communications at more than 150 congresses, and is the author of 57 books and more than 400 publications.

Member of the Real Sociedad geográfica, Sociedad Geográfica Española, the Royal Geographical Society, and the Institute of British Geographers. He was awarded the Medal of Honor of the Real Sociedad Geográfica in 2004 and the rank of Fellow of the Royal Geographical Society in 2009. From 2008 to 2016, he was a member of the Board of Directors and a delegate in Barcelona of Sociedad Geográfica Española, focusing especially on the field of Expeditions and outreach activities.

== Publications and outreach ==
At present, his work focuses on the field of economics, with issues of Macroeconomics, Public Finance, Business Creation, and Family business. As well as the field of geography, he focuses on multicultural development in the Middle East and Central Asia, the problems of the African economy, and issues relating to Antarctica.

Throughout his career, he has visited more than 200 countries and spoken at conferences and meetings in institutions such as Casa Asia, Casa América, Sociedad Greográfica Española and the Institute of North American Studies.

He has directed the exploration and adventure sections of the radio programs "La aventura es un placer" on Antena 3 Radio (1990-1992), "Lugares no recomendables" on Ràdio 4 (2005-2007) and the television program "Manoa" on 25 TV (2002-2004).
