= La Salle Campus Barcelona =

Higher education centre in Barcelona, Spain

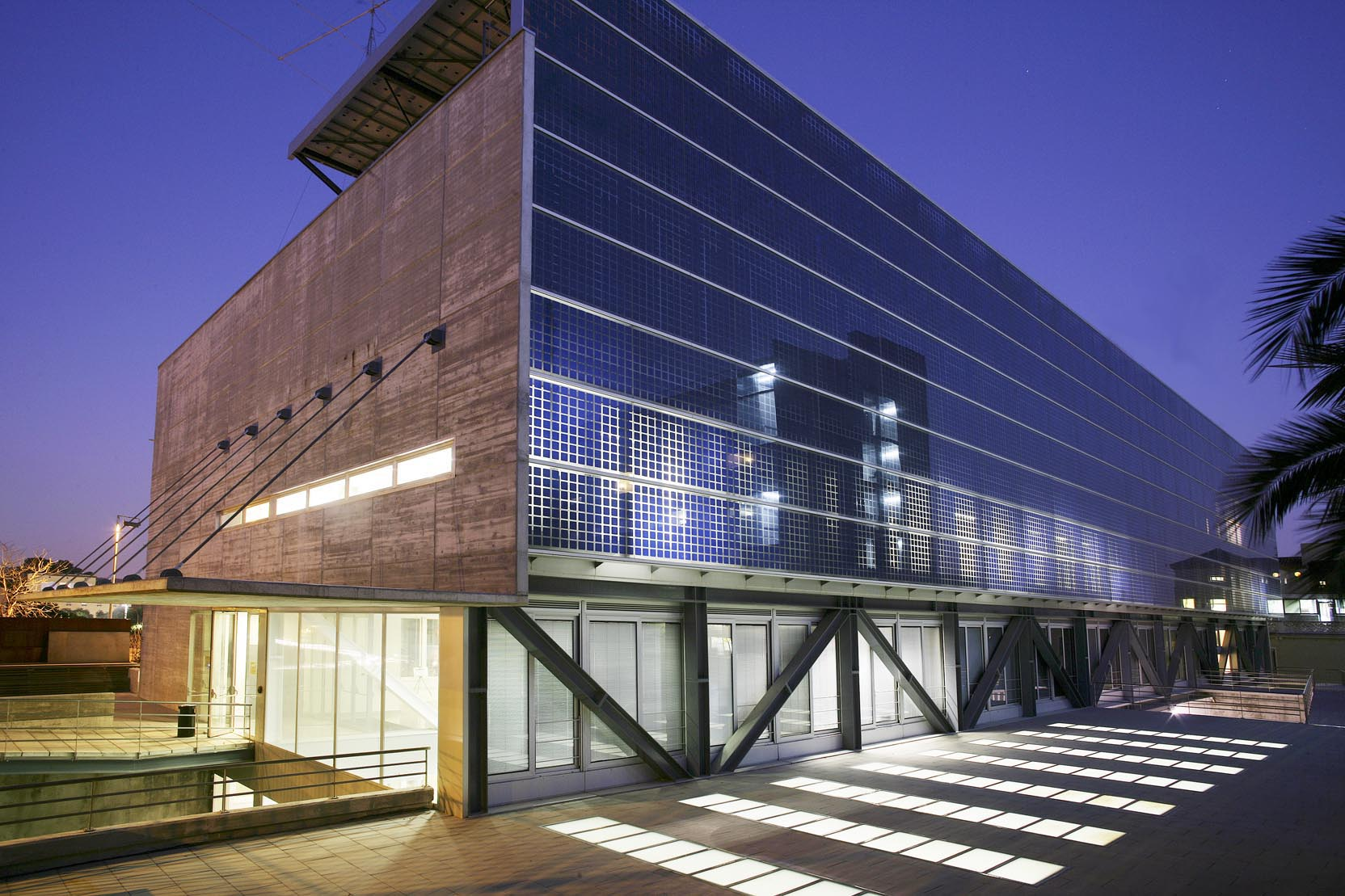
- Edifici Sant Jaume (2008)
- Type: Private higher education centre
- Established: 1903
- Affiliation: Brothers of the Christian Schools
- Director: Josep M. Santos (General Director)
- Academic staff: 1,361 (2025)
- Students: 8,727 (2025)
- Location: Barcelona, Spain; 41°24′33.6″N 2°07′48.5″E
- Campus: Sarrià-Sant Gervasi
- Website: www.salleurl.edu

La Salle Campus Barcelona is a higher education centre located in the Sarrià-Sant Gervasi district of Barcelona, Catalonia, Spain. It is a founding member of the Universitat Ramon Llull (URL), which was recognised by the Parliament of Catalonia in May 1991 as the first private university in Spain. The campus is part of the international network of La Salle educational institutions managed by the Brothers of the Christian Schools.

== History ==
The origins of university-level teaching at La Salle Campus Barcelona date back to 1903, when the Brothers of the Christian Schools at the Colegio La Salle Bonanova began offering industrial surveying studies.

In 1991, the Parliament of Catalonia recognised the creation of the Universitat Ramon Llull, in which La Salle participated as a founding member with two schools: the University School of Technical Telecommunications Engineering (EUETT) and the Higher Technical School of Electronic and Computer Engineering.

In 2001, La Salle Technova Barcelona, the campus innovation park, was inaugurated. It is a member of the International Association of Science Parks and Areas of Innovation (IASP). In 2016, La Salle Technova Barcelona was recognised as one of the ten best accelerators in Europe, and in 2017 it received the award for best Business Angels Network from the Spanish Association of Business Angels (AEBAN).

In 2020, the Internet of Things Institute of Catalonia (IoTiCAT) was established with support from the European Regional Development Fund and the Generalitat de Catalunya.

In September 2023, the School of Engineering appointed Dr. Guiomar Corral as its director, the first woman to hold the position in the school's hundred-year history.

In 2024, the Interactive Arts & Science Laboratory (IASlab) was inaugurated, a transdisciplinary laboratory dedicated to research in digital arts and technological innovation. The laboratory has collaborated with events such as the Sónar festival and the MIRA festival, as well as with institutions such as the Josep Trueta University Hospital. IASlab has also participated in immersive heritage recovery projects, including the reconstruction of La font de l'Aurora, a Barcelona sculpture dismantled in 1931.

== Academic structure ==
The teaching activity of La Salle Campus Barcelona is organised into four schools:

- Higher Technical School of Engineering La Salle-URL (ETSELS)
- Higher Technical School of Architecture La Salle-URL (ETSALS)
- International Faculty of Commerce and Digital Economy La Salle-URL (FICEDLS)
- Faculty of Philosophy La Salle-URL

The campus also includes Brooder Lab, an incubator specialising in animation, visual effects (VFX), and digital arts.

== Rankings ==
In 2025, Forbes magazine ranked URL as the top private university in Catalonia in its classification of the most highly regarded private Spanish universities by companies.
