= Abat Oliba CEU University =

Private university in Barcelona, Spain

Coordinates: 41°24′36″N 2°07′35″E

- Universitat Abat Oliba
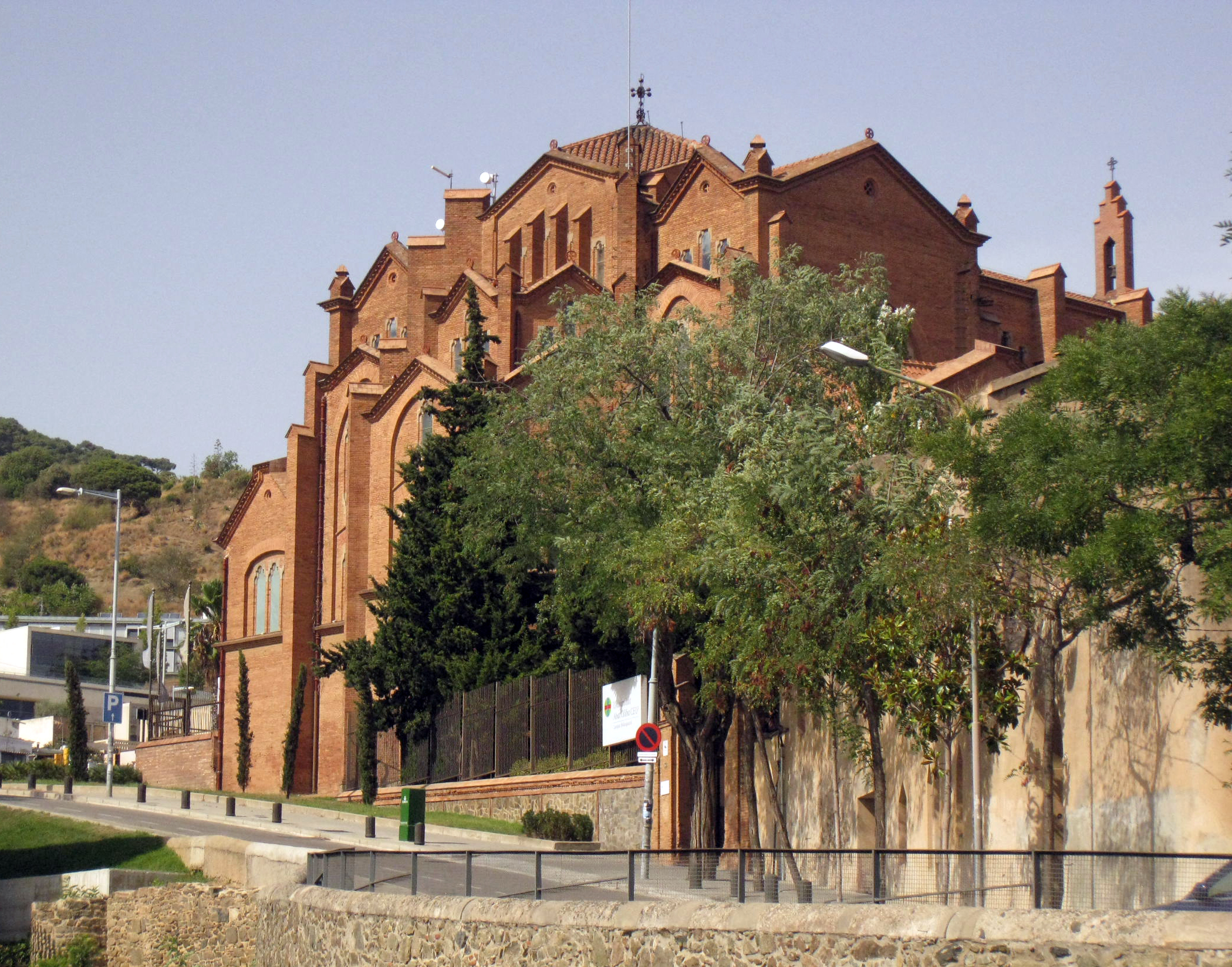
- Motto: Viam sapientiæ monstrabo
- Type: Private
- Established: 2003
- Affiliations: Catholic; CEU
- Rector: Arcadi Gual Sala
- Students: 3,200
- Location: Barcelona, Spain
- Campus: Bellesguard
- Website: uaoceu.es

Abat Oliba CEU University (official name: Universitat Abat Oliba CEU; UAO CEU) is a private university located in Barcelona, Spain. It was founded in 1973 as the Abat Oliba College. In 2003, the Parliament of Catalonia approved its conversion to Abat Oliba CEU University. The university adopts the name of Abbot Oliba, Count of Berga and Ripoll, bishop of Vic, and founder of Montserrat because "aimed at making its spirit who established a thousand years the foundations of emerging Catalonia based on Roman and Christian culture".

Abbot Oliba is considered a key figure in the repopulation of Catalonia based on Roman and Christian culture, and political pacifism and his assemblies of Peace and Truce of God laid the groundwork for one of the first parliaments in Europe.

It is one of the three Spanish universities belonging to the Centro de Estudios Universitarios CEU educational group. It belongs to the Catholic Association of Propagandists, an institution created in 1908 by the Jesuit priest Ángel Ayala.

The main campus of the UAO CEU is the Bellesguard Campus, in the district of Sarrià-Sant Gervasi. The architect Miquel Àngel Armengou, based in Barcelona, designed and built the university around the church at its centre

== History ==
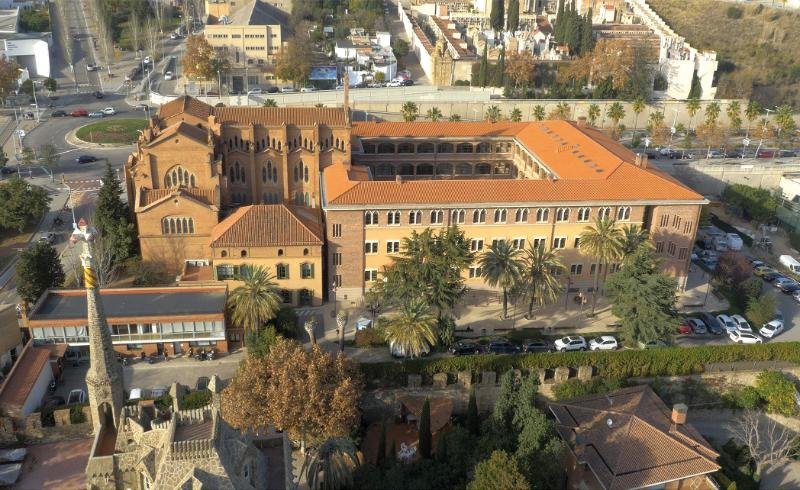
Abat Oliba CEU University Campus in Barcelona

The origin of the current university is in the CDES Abat Oliba, an institution created by Fundación San Pablo-CEU in 1973 in Barcelona. The center started its activities in January 1974 through an affiliation agreement with the University of Barcelona. In 1995 it became known as the Center for Higher Education Abat Oliba and offered degrees in Law, Business Administration and Management, and Economy. In 2003, the Parliament of Catalonia recognized Abat Oliba CEU University as a new university.

In 1992 he acquired the complex built by the modernist architect Bernardí Martorell at the behest of the benefactor Francesca Balart, to convert it into its current headquarters, which opened in 1995. That same year, coinciding with the refurbishment by the architect Miquel Àngel Armengou, it was renamed the Abat Oliba Higher Education Centre, incorporating university studies in Law, Business Administration and Management and the first cycle of Economics.

Eight years later, in 2003, the Abat Oliba CEU University is recognised by Law 20/2003, of 4 July 2003, of the Parliament of Catalonia. It thus becomes one of the three Spanish universities belonging to the CEU educational group.

The spring of 2007 saw the birth of the Goliad UAO CEU Awards, prizes given annually by the advertising and communication students of the Abat Oliba CEU University. In 2012 the institution started an annual conferenced titled UAO CEU International Journalism Week, lasting an entire week (Monday to Friday), and hosting presentations by professionals and scholars of Journalism. Also in 2012, the Abat Oliba CEU University and the totality of the Catalan universities pledged to defend the Catalan linguistic immersion model and proposed a coordinated access to the Catalan university system.

The university's rectors since then have been: Juan Corona Ramón (2003–2004) José María Alsina Roca (2004–2009); Carlos Pérez del Valle (2009–2017), Eva Perea (2017-2018), Rafael Rodriguez-Ponga y Salamanca (2019-2024) and Arcadi Gual Sala (since 2024).

== Structure ==
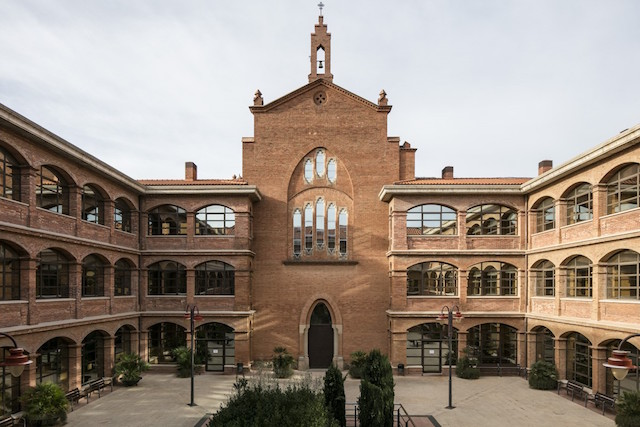
Cloister of Abat Oliba CEU University

The UAO CEU has a tripartite structure of three faculties: the Faculty of Law and Business, whose dean is Dr María Jesús Pesqueira Zamora; the Faculty of Communication, Education and Humanities, whose dean is Dr Enrique Martínez García, and the Faculty of Psychology, whose dean is Dr Martín Echevarría. They offer undergraduate, master's and postgraduate degrees in the areas of Communication, Law and Political Science, Education, Business and Economics, Humanities and Psychology.

In 2017 Unesco awarded the UAO CEU the Chair of Peace, Solidarity and Intercultural Dialogue, to promote a comprehensive concept of peace.

This Chair is joined by the Chair of Family Business and Business Creation; the Chair in the Solidarity Economy; the Gift & Task Chair in Bioethics and Law; the Rey Martín El Humano, Count of Barcelona Chair; and in 2019, coinciding with the commemoration of the 500th anniversary, the CEU Elcano - First Journey Around the World Chair.

2020 saw the creation of the Antonio de Montserrat Chair of Global Studies and the Jean Monnet Chair on Fiscal Integration in the European Union, financed with European competitive funds from the Erasmus+ call for Jean Monnet activities. There is also the Labour Observatory, dedicated to current issues in the world of work, and the Institute of Health Sciences.

UAO CEU has six research groups: MULTICULTCOM (Communication and Conflict in a Multicultural Society), TRIVIUM (Family, Education and Inclusive Schooling), EAEDIUM (Applied Economics, Economics of Education and Market Research), EJES (Employability, Youth and Social Exclusion), GREFE (Family Business and Entrepreneurship) and PROSOPON (Person and Personal Life).

The UAO CEU is part of the Conference of Rectors of Spanish Universities (CRUE); the Vives Network of Universities, whose presidency it held for the 2019–2020 period; as well as the European Association for International Education and the International Council of Universities of Saint Thomas Aquinas. In 2020, the university joined the European Federation of Catholic Universities and the International Platform for Cooperation and Migration. It is part of the CEU educational group and is one of three CEU Universities.

== Activities ==
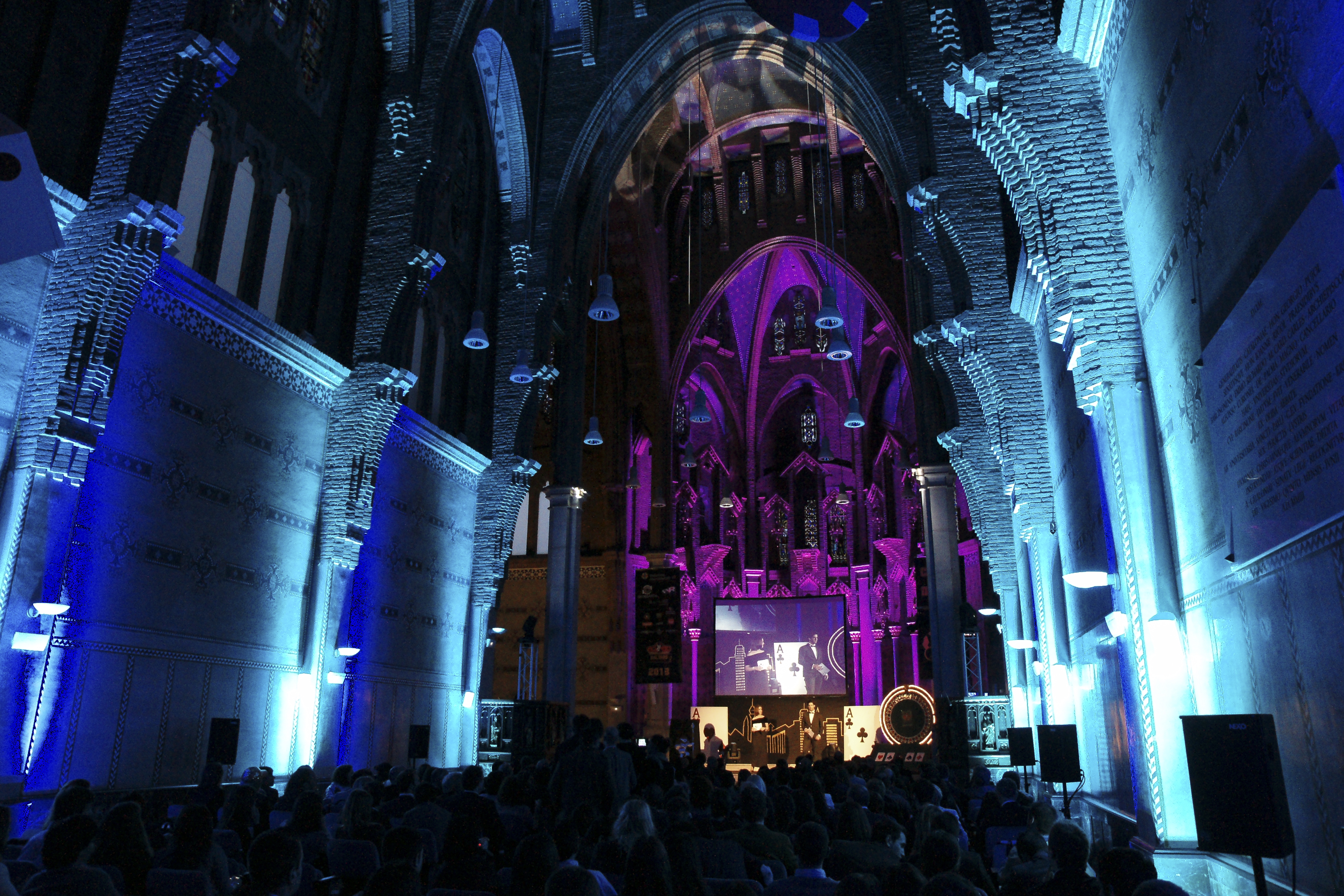
UAO CEU GoliADs Awards Ceremony

In addition to its research and teaching function, UAO CEU organises cultural and informative activities. 2007 saw the creation of the annual GoliADs UAO CEU Awards for advertising and communication, awarded by students of Abat Oliba CEU University in Barcelona to advertising agencies and the media.

Since 2013, it has organised the BCN Thinking Challenge, a university marathon of social entrepreneurship created by the university's Entrepreneurship Club.

In 2015, the Education Talks were created, spaces for innovation in education which are organised in two annual sessions, one session on educational innovation and another on a monographic theme.

In 2017, the Digital Communication Week was launched. Two editions have been held: one focused on the role of artificial intelligence and the other on digital transformation. It is held as part of the Official Master's Degree in Digital Communication and New Technologies.

In the context of the Family, Education and Inclusive Schooling Research Group, the Word in Education conferences are held annually, with rotating venues at Abat Oliba CEU University, the Jesuit University of Philosophy and Education Ignatianum (Poland) and the Facultés Libres de Philosophie et de Psychologie (France).

Other conferences that the UAO CEU organises are the Law and Society Conference and the European Conference of Christian Anthropology and Mental Health Sciences, which were held for the first time in September 2018 and 2019, respectively.

The UAO CEU was the first university to join the 'Universitats amb cor' programme of Caritas Internationalis in Barcelona. It is part of the CEU educational group, the private educational institution that allocates most resources in Spain to scholarships and study grants.

== Acknowledgements ==
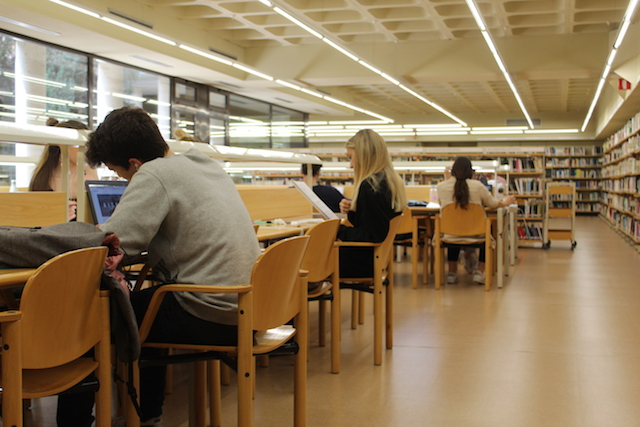
UAO CEU library

According to the 2009 Spanish universities ranking by the Institute for Industrial and Financial Analysis (IAIF) of the Complutense University of Madrid, the Abat Oliba CEU University ranks 1st among the Catalan private universities in terms of teaching. In research, the university holds the 3rd position nationwide. One of the patrons of the university is the Archbishop of Barcelona, currently Juan José Omella.

UAO CEU is the highest-ranking private Catalan university in Spain, as accredited by the Institute of Industrial and Financial Analysis (IAIF) of the Complutense University of Madrid. In Spain, UAO CEU ranks third place, behind only the University of Navarra and the Comillas Pontifical University.

In the seventh survey on the labour market outcomes of graduates of Catalan universities (2020), which is carried out by the Agency for Quality Assurance in the University System of Catalonia, UAO CEU graduates achieved an employment rate of 95.3%, several points above the average of other universities in the field of Social Sciences.

According to the study Via Universitària (2016), by the Jaume Bofill Foundation and the Xarxa Vives d'Universitats 85% of UAO CEU students are satisfied with their studies. The seventh ranking of universities of the CyD Foundation (2020) highlighted the performance of UAO CEU in the fields of international mobility, international teaching staff, placements in companies in the region, graduation rate and rate of return on degree.

According to the QS World University Rankings, drawn up by Times Higher Education, CEU universities are among the 500 best in the world and rank sixth among Spanish universities.

== Headquarters ==
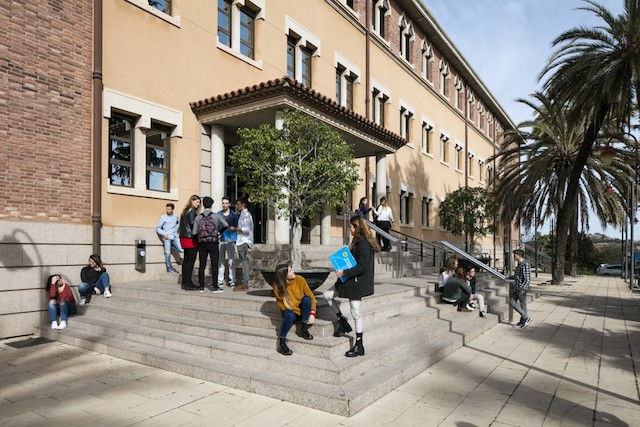
Main entrance of the university

UAO CEU has its main campus at the Bellesguard Campus, located around the former summer palace of the House of Barcelona, where King Martin of Aragon, also known as Martin the Humane, died.

In 1900, part of the plot was segregated so that the architect Antoni Gaudí could build a residence for the industrialist Jaume Figueres, known as Torre Bellesguard. On the rest of the land, in 1925, the Oblates of the Most Holy Redeemer promoted a religious community for carrying out social work, built by the architect Bernardí Martorell thanks to the generosity of Francesca Balart. Martorell, a disciple of Gaudí, designed a church with hyperboloid vaults, which today serves as the Aula Magna / Aula Sacra.

The church and the cloister were fitted out as headquarters for the UAO CEU by the architect Miquel Àngel Armengou in 1992. In 2018, refurbishment work was undertaken in the Aula Magna / Aula Sacra, with the installation of an underfloor heating system and new audiovisual equipment. In 2019, the new radio, television and photography studios were inaugurated.

== Governance ==
- Dr. Arcadi Gual Sala: Rector
- Dr. Sergio Rodríguez López-Ros: Pro-Rector for Institutional Relations and Academic Staff
- Dr. Swen Seebach: Vice-Rector for Academic Planning and Quality
- Dr. Alessandro Mini: Vice-Rector for Research and International Relations
- Dr. Joan Ripoll, Vice-Rector for Teaching Staff
- Dr. Laura Amado: Vice-Rector for Students

== Alumni ==
Alumni of the university include:

- Miquel Calçada i Olivella: journalist, co-founder of the Flaix Group.
- Dolors Montserrat i Montserrat: Member of the European Parliament (MEP).
- Jaume Alonso-Cuevillas: jurist, lawyer and economist.
- Joana Ortega: politician.
- Juan Carlos Girauta: politician and writer.
- Joan Puigdollers i Fargas: politician.
- Mao Ye Wu: director of RCD Espanyol.
- Lidan Qi: managing partner at Qimeng Global.
- Fernando de Páramo: politician and journalist.
- Neus Munté: lawyer and politician.
- Sergio Heredia: journalist.
- Juan Velayos: lawyer, businessman and real estate developer.
- Pablo de Porcioles: deputy General manager of Godó Strategies.
- Anton Verdeny: managing partner of Massagué & Verdeny.
- Carina Mejías: lawyer and politician.
- José Luis Ayllon: lawyer and politician.
- Víctor López: political consultant.
- Jorge Moragas: Spanish politician and diplomat.
- Mª Eugencia Gay: dean of the Barcelona Bar Association.
- Eva Parera i Escrichs: lawyer, businesswoman and politician.

== Bibliography ==
- Borràs i Abelló, Jordi (2015). Desmuntant Societat Civil Catalana (in Catalan). Edicions Saldonar. ISBN 9788494675355.
