= Esteve Almirall Mezquita =

Spanish scientist and academic

Esteve Almirall
- Born: Spain
- Occupations: Management scientist and an academic

Academic background
- Education: MS., Computer Information Systems; MS., Business Management; MRes., Artificial Intelligence; Ph.D., Management Sciences

Esteve Almirall is a Spanish management scientist and an academic. He is a full professor in the Department of Operations, Innovation, and Data Sciences at ESADE, Universitat Ramon Llull.

Almirall is most known for his works in Open Innovation, particularly in the contexts of complexity simulations, Smart Cities, and the societal impacts of A.I. He serves as the director of the Center for Innovation in Cities at ESADE Business School.

== Education ==
Almirall holds a PhD in Management Sciences from ESADE, as well as degrees including an MCIS, DEA, and MRes in Artificial Intelligence from UPC. He also has an MBA and a PDD from IESE, a Diploma in Marketing from UC Berkeley, a GCPCL Diploma from Harvard Business School, and a degree in Computer Science from UPC.

== Career ==
Almirall had a former career before academia in Information Technologies. He was a CTO in the Spanish banking industry. He founded several companies and participated in tech startups. He has been teaching in Competing with AI and Cloud, Open Innovation, Python, and AWS. He has also served as a professor at EPFL (Lausanne), UPF (Barcelona), UPC (Barcelona), and IESE (Barcelona), and lectured at vuniversities, including UC Berkeley and Purdue. One of his known contributions was the creation, as academic director, of Esade's Master in Business Analytics.

Almirall served as an expert for the World Bank and the International Development Bank and the European Commission, where he coordinated EU competitive projects and participated as the lead researcher in them.

Almirall is also frequent contributor to the general press, TV and radios such as La Vanguardia, El País, Expansión, Catalunya Radio El Nacional and Forbes.

== Research and publications ==
As a researcher, Almirall has more than 7,500 citations. His research has been published in scientific journals including Academy of Management Review, MISQ, Government Information Quarterly, California Management Review, Harvard Business Review, Journal of the Knowledge Economy, Technology Innovation Management Review, Technology Analysis and Strategic Management, California Management Review, California Association of Community Managers, ACM, and Government Information and Management Information Systems.

In a 2008 article, which got published in Electronic Journal of Organizational Virtualness, Almirall examined how Living Labs addressed the challenges of integrating user contributions into innovation processes by providing structure and methodologies, enhancing Open Innovation and Systems of Innovation, and evaluated their effectiveness and limitations in this role. Through his 2012 study, he explored European living labs as an innovation methodology, compared their various approaches, assessed their impact, and evaluated their effectiveness and appropriateness relative to other innovation methods. Following this, his 2013 study analyzed Barcelona's transformation into a Smart City, examining its use of information and communication technologies (ICTs) across various urban sectors, and its effectiveness in implementation. In collaboration with M Lee and others, his 2014 paper explored the implementation of open innovation in cities, highlighted the shortcomings of organizing external sources solely as collaborative communities or competitive markets, and proposed an integrated approach to address the diverse needs of the innovation ecosystem. Investigating the role of cities in driving innovation and entrepreneurship, his 2016 paper analyzed tensions between innovators, entrepreneurs, local governments, and citizens as they collaborate to enhance quality of life and promote economic growth at the local level. In 2017, he published a paper with M Bogers and others. The paper provided an overview of research on open innovation, presenting main perspectives, themes, and opportunities for future research. The study also emphasized the importance of studying open innovation across multiple levels of analysis and proposed new research categories and questions for advancement in the field.

== Selected articles ==
- Almirall, E., & Wareham, J. (2008). Living labs and open innovation: Roles and applicability. eJOV: The Electronic Journal for Virtual Organization & Networks, 10.
- Almirall, E., & Casadesus-Masanell, R. (2010). Open versus closed innovation: A model of discovery and divergence. Academy of Management Review, 35(1), 27–47.
- Almirall, E., Lee, M., & Wareham, J. (2012). Mapping living labs in the landscape of innovation methodologies. Technology Innovation Management Review, 2(9).
- Bakıcı, T., Almirall, E., & Wareham, J. (2013). A smart city initiative: the case of Barcelona. Journal of the Knowledge Economy, 4, 135–148.
- Bogers, M., Zobel, A. K., Afuah, A., Almirall, E., Brunswicker, S., Dahlander, L., ... & Ter Wal, *A. L. (2017). The open innovation research landscape: Established perspectives and emerging themes across different levels of analysis. Industry and Innovation, 24(1), 8-40.
