= Alcorcillo =

- Flag Coat of arms

- Location in Spain
- Coordinates: 41°43′07″N 6°22′35″W
- Country: Spain
- Autonomous community: Castile and León
- Province: Zamora
- Municipality: Alcañices

Population (2014)
  - Total: 98
- Time zone: UTC+1 (CET)
  - Summer (DST): UTC+2 (CEST)

Alcorcillo is a locality in the municipality of Alcañices, province of Zamora, Castile and León, Spain. According to the 2014 census (INE), the locality has a population of 98 inhabitants.

== See also ==
- List of municipalities in Zamora
