= Rafael Rodríguez-Ponga =

Spanish civil servant (born 1960)

Rafael Rodríguez-Ponga y Salamanca
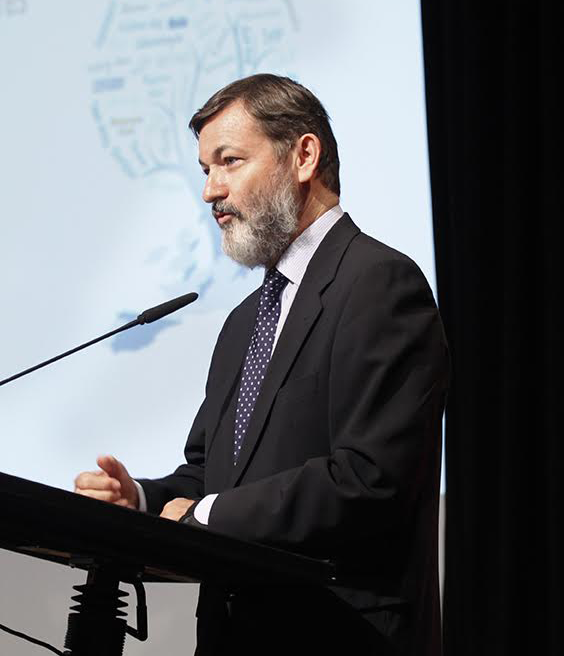

General Secretary of Instituto Cervantes
- In office 14 April 2012 – 24 September 2018
- Preceded by: Carmen Pérez-Fragero
- Succeeded by: Carmen Noguero Galilea

Member of the Congress of Deputies
- In office 9 June 2011 – 16 April 2012

Personal details
- Born: February 9, 1960 (age 66) Madrid, Spain
- Party: PP
- Spouse: Paloma Albalá Hernández (m. 1985) (widower)
- Children: Four
- Education: Universidad Complutense de Madrid

Rafael Rodríguez-Ponga y Salamanca (shortly Rafael R-Ponga, born 1960, in Madrid) is a Spanish linguist and high-ranking civil servant, with a wide administrative, academic and political activity. He is rector of Abat Oliba CEU University of Barcelona. He has been Secretary-General of Instituto Cervantes.

== Education ==
Dr. Ponga graduated in Hispanic linguistics at Complutense University of Madrid. Years later, he obtained a doctorate (Ph.D.) in linguistics at the same university.

In 1984, he passed a process of public examination to become a funcionario. He first serviced at the Office of the Spokesperson of the Government (inside the Palace of Moncloa).

== Professional career ==
In 1987 he was appointed Counselor of Information and Press at the Spanish Embassy in Mexico. Back in Madrid in 1990, he serviced at the Ministry of the Spokesman of the Government and. He is appointed Sud-Director of Relations and Cooperation of the aforementioned Ministry in 1993, which is later transferred to the Ministry of the Presidency (Alfredo Pérez Rubalcaba being the Minister).

Right after the electoral win by the PP in 1996, he is appointed Director-General of Cultural Cooperation and Communication by Esperanza Aguirre, the then Minister of Education and Culture. He kept his post in 1999 when Mariano Rajoy became the new Minister.

He is transferred to the Ministry of Foreign Affairs in 2000 as Director-General of Cultural and Scientific Relations. A year later, he is appointed Secretary General of the Spanish Agency for International Cooperation by the then Minister, Josep Piqué. He will keep this post with Ana Palacio.

== Political career ==
Because of the electoral change in May 2004 (general elections were won by the Spanish Socialist Workers' Party), he leaves the Public Service and starts to work at the central office of the Spanish People's Party and becomes a member of its National Executive Committee. He reorganized PP structure overseas, overviewed policies on immigration and social affairs and gets elected MP in the 2008 general elections (taking office in 2011 as MP for Madrid province). He was elected again as Member of Parliament in November 20, 2011 (for Caceres province), but he resigned.

He has been the National Secretary of Social Participation of the Spanish People's Party.

Since 2008 to 2012, he has also been member of the Council of Administration of Telemadrid.

== Academic activity ==
In addition to his professional and political career, he has developed an intellectual activity involving Spanish language and culture, specially about Asia and the Pacific.

In 2012 he was appointed Secretary General of Instituto Cervantes. He stayed in office until 2018.

He was elected vicepresident and then president of the European Union National Instituts for Culture EUNIC.

In february 2019 he has been appointed rector of Universitat Abat Oliba CEU, of Barcelona.

In 1985 he received a research grant from the Foundation Juan March, which allowed him to travel to the Philippines, the Mariana Islands and Japan. Thanks to this research, he wrote his thesis (dissertation) on the relation between the Spanish and the Chamorro languages, which granted him a Doctorate (summa cum laude) in Philology at the Complutense University.

He has written several works and the book about chamorro language and contact languages in the Pacific, Del español al chamorro, lenguas en contacto en el Pacífico, Madrid 2009. In 2009, an international group of scholars interested in the Chamorro language founded CHiN, the Chamorro Linguistics International Network, of which he is the President.

His book Poesía para vencer a la muerte ('Poetry to overcome death') (Madrid, Pigmalión, 2023) is an essay and a selection of poems by more than one hundred poets from several countries, languages and religions.

== Social activity ==
In 2007 he is appointed President of the Fundación Humanismo y Democracia (H+D) (Foundation Humanism and Democracy). He is also President of the International Platform for Cooperation and Migration (IPCM), which was created in association with other European organizations.
