= Santa Ana, Zamora =

Santa Ana
- Flag Coat of arms

- Location in Spain
- Coordinates: 41°41′23″N 6°24′48″W
- Country: Spain
- Autonomous community: Castile and León
- Province: Zamora
- Municipality: Alcañices

Population (2014)
  - Total: 20
- Time zone: UTC+1 (CET)
  - Summer (DST): UTC+2 (CEST)

Santa Ana is a locality located within the municipality of Alcañices, province of Zamora, Castile and León, Spain. According to the 2014 census (INE) the locality has a population of 20 inhabitants.

== See also ==
- List of municipalities in Zamora
