= Tomás Pellicer Frutos =

Spanish physician (1816–1902)

His Excellency Tomás Pellicer Frutos
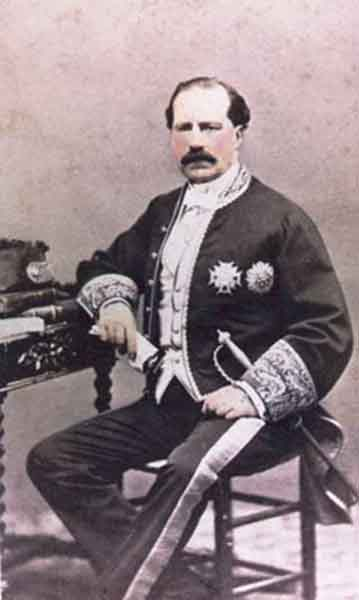

Personal details
- Born: September 18, 1816
- Died: February 15, 1902
- Children: 3
- Education: University of Valencia (MD)
- Occupation: Physician and Researcher
- Awards: Order of Charles III; Order of Isabella the Catholic; Order of Beneficence
- Scientific career
- Fields: Hematology

Tomás Pellicer Frutos (18 September 1816 – 15 February 1902) was a Spanish physician and one of the pioneers of homeopathy.

== Biography ==
Pellicer Frutos was born in Era Alta, Murcia. His family descended from Berenguer Pellicer, the Catalan knight who participated with king James I of Aragon in the reconquest of Murcia. In 1827 he moved to Madrid to study Medicine, obtaining in 1837 the title of graduate in Medicine from the University of Valencia.

In 1846, he learned about the work of Samuel Hahnemann, a pioneer in the development of Homeopathy as a scientific discipline, and moved to Madrid in 1853 where he joined the Hahnemannian Society of Madrid. After a first period in the Valencia Clinical Hospital, in 1873 he promoted the founding of the Homeopathic Institute of Madrid and the San José Hospital in the same city, the first homeopathic hospital built in Spain, of which he progressively became a professor (1873), professor (1878) and director (1880).

In 1863 Pellicer was appointed Commander of the Order of Charles III, in 1865 he obtained the First Class Cross of the Civil Order of Beneficence and in 1868 he was distinguished with the Grand Cross of the Order of Isabella the Catholic. In 1842, he entered the Royal Academy of Medicine and Surgery of Murcia as a corresponding academic, being elected permanent academic in 1870.

From 1867 he was a consultant to the Hahnnemann Hospital in Paris and physician of the Spanish Royal Household, being the personal doctor of H.R.H. the Infante Sebastian of Portugal and Spain, whom his son Joaquín Pellicer – also physician – attended him to on his death in Pau in 1870.

== Personal life ==
After marrying twice, he had three children: Joaquín (whose son became Marquis of Ordoño), Leonor y Josefa. He died in Murcia on 15 February 1902, at the age of 86. Among his disciples were Fermín Rodríguez Ortega, Fernando de Ortega and Esteban Esparza.
