= Xarxa Vives d'Universitats =

Organization of Catalan-language universities

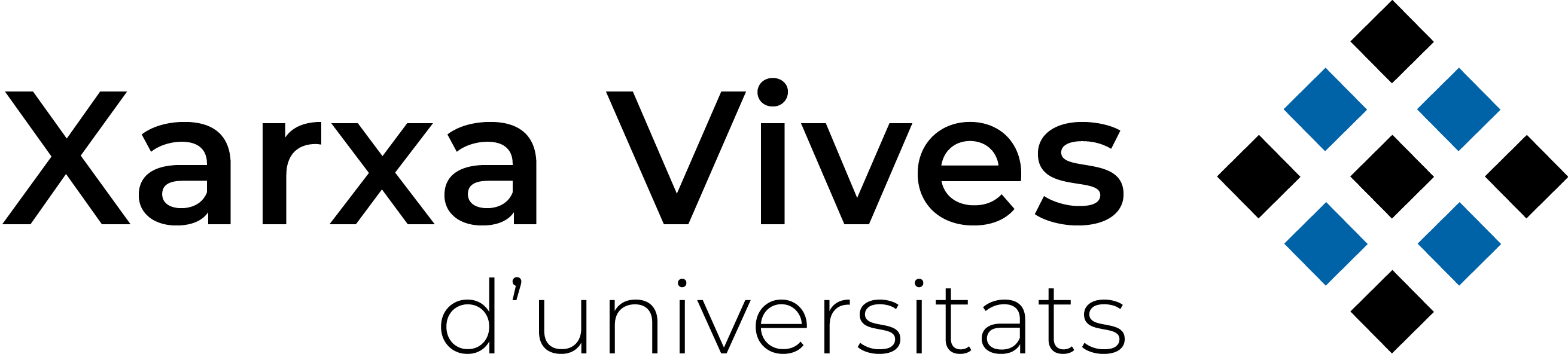
XVU Logo

The Xarxa Vives d'Universitats (Catalan pronunciation: [ˈʃaɾʃə ˈβiβəz ðuniβəɾsiˈtats], acronym: XVU; English: "Vives Network"), formerly known as Institut Joan Lluís Vives (English: "Joan Lluís Vives Institute"), is the network of Catalan language universities. XVU was founded in 1994 and it is headquartered in the Valencian Community, in the city of Castelló de la Plana. On 21 May 2008, it was integrated into the Ramon Llull Institute.

The institute is named after Joan Lluís Vives, a prominent Valencian scholar and humanist from the 16th century.

== Members ==
The network currently comprises 21 universities situated in the Catalan language domain, in four different states (Andorra, France, Italy and Spain). It consists of the following 21 universities:

1. Abat Oliba CEU University (Barcelona)
2. Autonomous University of Barcelona (Barcelona)
3. International University of Catalonia (Barcelona)
4. Jaume I University (Castelló de la Plana)
5. Miguel Hernández University of Elche (Elche)
6. Open University of Catalonia (Barcelona)
7. Polytechnic University of Catalonia (Barcelona)
8. Polytechnic University of Valencia (Valencia)
9. Pompeu Fabra University (Barcelona)
10. Ramon Llull University (Barcelona)
11. Rovira i Virgili University (Tarragona and Reus)
12. University of Alicante (Alicante)
13. University of Andorra (Sant Julià de Lòria, Andorra)
14. University of the Balearic Islands (Palma)
15. University of Barcelona (Barcelona)
16. University of Girona (Girona)
17. University of Lleida (Lleida)
18. University of Perpignan (Perpignan)
19. University of Sassari (Sassari)
20. University of Valencia (Valencia)
21. University of Vic (Vic)
