= Josep Maria Esquirol Calaf =

Catalan philosopher, essayist and professor

Josep Maria Esquirol
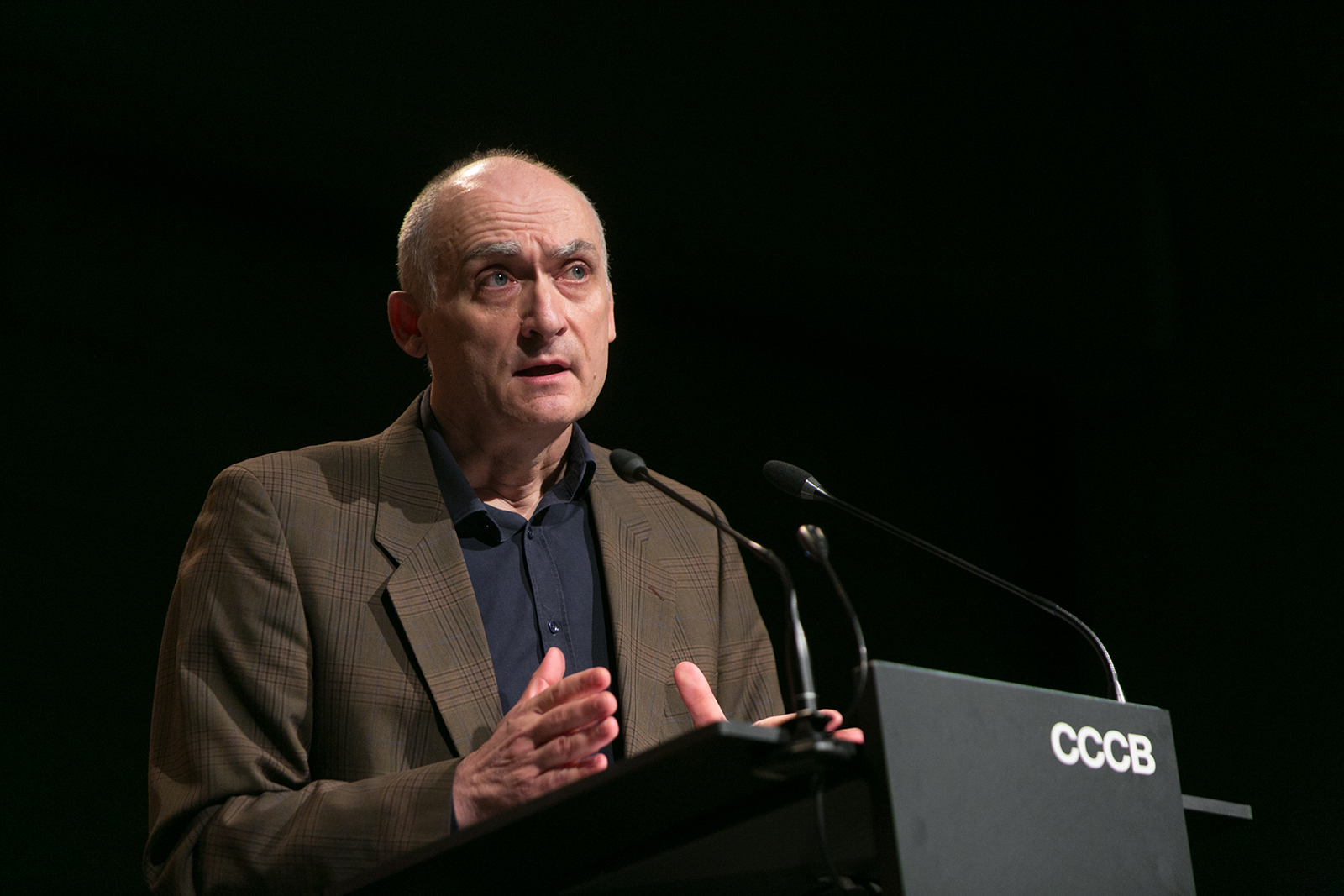
- Born: 1963 (age 62–63); Sant Joan de Mediona, Spain
- Occupations: Writer, Philosopher, University Professor, Essayist
- Employer: University of Barcelona
- Awards: Joan Maragall Prize (1993) Ciutat de Barcelona Prize (2016) Spanish National Essay Prize (2016)

Josep Maria Esquirol Calaf (born 1963, Mediona) is a Catalan philosopher, essayist and professor of philosophy at the University of Barcelona. He directs the Aporia Research Group, whose field of study is contemporary philosophy and, specifically, the relationship between philosophy and psychiatry.

He is also the author of several books recognized in this field, which shape his philosophical proposal; one of note is The intimate resistance (2015), which won the Ciutat de Barcelona Prize and also the National Essay Prize of the Spanish Ministry of Education, Culture and Sports. Others of his most notable books are La penúltima bondad: Ensayo sobre la vida humana (2018), Los filósofos contemporáneos y la técnica. De Ortega a Sloterdijk (2011), El respirar de los días (2010), El Respeto o la mirada atenta (2006) and Uno mismo y los otros. De las experiencias existenciales a la interculturalidad (2005).

== Thought ==
Josep Maria Esquirol has drawn up his own philosophical proposal, which he designates as a “philosophy of proximity”. It consists of a philosophical anthropology with both Socratic and Franciscan resonances. Also, it remains in constant dialogue with contemporary thought, while it is expressed in a language very close to the experience.

The works that build this philosophical approach have received several awards, and some of them are also being published in Italian, Portuguese, English and German.

== Works ==
- Raó i fonament, Barcelona, PPU, 1988. ISBN 978-84-7665-235-0
- Responsabilitat i món de la vida. Estudi sobre la fenomenologia husserliana, Barcelona, Anthropos, 1992. ISBN 978-84-7658-337-1
- D'Europa als homes, Barcelona, Cruïlla, 1994. ISBN 978-84-7629-876-3
- Tres ensayos de filosofía política, Barcelona, EUB, 1996. ISBN 84-89607-71-0
- La frivolidad política del final de la historia, Madrid, Caparrós, 1998. ISBN 84-87943-67-5
- Què és el personalisme? Introducció a la lectura d'Emmanuel Mounier, Barcelona, Pòrtic, 2001. ISBN 84-7306-758-4
- Uno mismo y los otros. De las experiencias existenciales a la interculturalidad, Barcelona, Herder, 2005. ISBN 84-254-2440-2
- El respeto o la mirada atenta, Barcelona, Gedisa, 2006. ISBN 84-9784-130-1
- El respirar dels dies, Barcelona, Paidós, 2009. ISBN 978-84-493-2226-6
- Los filósofos contemporáneos y la técnica. De Ortega a Sloterdijk, Barcelona, Gedisa, 2011. ISBN 978-84-9784-679-0
- La resistència íntima: Assaig d'una filosofia de la proximitat. Barcelona, Quaderns Crema, 2015. ISBN 978-84-7727-565-7[4]
- La penúltima bondat: Assaig sobre la vida humana, Barcelona, Quaderns Crema, 2018. ISBN 978-84-7727-587-9[5]
- Humà, més humà: Una antropologia de la ferida infinita, Quaderns Crema, 2021. ISBN 978-84-7727-644-9

== Translated works ==
- Respeito ou o olhar atento. Uma ética para a era da ciencia e da tecnologia, Belo Horizonte, Autêntica Editora, 2008. ISBN 978-85-7526-322-8
- O respirar dos días. Uma refexão filosófica sobre a experiência do tempo, Belo Horizonte, Autêntica Editora, 2010. ISBN 978-85-7526-509-3
- La resistenza intima. Saggio su una filosofia della prossimità, Milano, Vita e Pensiero, 2018. ISBN 978-88-343-3403-4
- La penúltima bontà. Saggio sulla vita humana, Milano, Vita e Pensiero, 2019. ISBN 978-88-343-3781-3
- A Resistência Íntima. Essaio de uma filosofia da proximidade, Lisboa, Ediçoes 70, 2020. ISBN 978-972-44-2333-3
- Umano, più umano. Un’antropologia della ferita infinita, Milano, Vita e Pensiero, 2021.
- The Intimate Resistance. A Philosophy of proximity, Full d’Estampa, London, 2021. ISBN 978-1-913744-08-3
- Der intime Widerstand. Eine Philosophie der Nähe, Meiner Verlag, Hamburg, 2021. ISBN 978-3-7873-3967-9

== Awards ==
The author has won several awards: in 1993, he won the Essay Prize from the Joan Maragall Foundation for the book D’Europa als homes, while in 2015 he won a prize named "Ciutat de Barcelona Award" in the category of Essay, Social Sciences and Humanities for his book The intimate resistance. One year later, in 2016, Josep Maria Esquirol won the Spanish National Essay Prize, also for his work The intimate resistance.
