= University Ramon Llull =

Private university in Barcelona, Catalonia, Spain

- Universitat Ramon Llull; Universidad Ramon Llull
- Other name: URL
- Motto: Ser y Saber (To be and to know)
- Type: Private university
- Established: 1990
- Affiliations: Vives Network
- President: Dr. Josep Antoni Rom Rodríguez
- Faculty: 1,587
- Undergraduates: 21,253 (2021/2022)
- Location: Barcelona, Spain; 41.411910°N 2.131218°E
- Campus: Urban
- Website: www.url.edu/en (engl.)

University Ramon Llull (Catalan: Universitat Ramon Llull, Spanish: Universidad Ramon Llull, URL; IPA: [uniβəɾsiˈtad rəˈmoɲ ˈʎuʎ]) is a private university located in Barcelona, Catalonia, Spain, established in 1990.

Currently it comprises several different colleges specializing in different subjects, most of which are located in downtown Barcelona.

== History ==
University Ramon Llull is named after Ramon Llull, a famous writer and philosopher born in the 13th century. University Ramon Llull was founded by four educational institutions to which others were added later. The URL comprises:

- ESADE (Escola Superior d'Administració i Direcció d'Empreses) (1958).
- La Salle Engineering and Architecture (1903).
- IQS (Institut Químic de Sarrià) - Chemical Institute of Sarrià (1905) and its two schools: IQS School of Engineering and IQS School of Management
- Blanquerna Foundation (1948).
- Pere Tarrés University School of Social Studies (1998).
- Ebro Observatory Research Institute (1904).
- Vidal i Barraquer Foundation - University Institute of Mental Health (1964).
- Borja Institute of Bioethics (1974).
- ESDi Higher School of Design (1989).

Liborio Hierro gave a conference organized by the URL and the Sant Joan de Déu in 1996. Among the promoters of the URL one can find Artur Juncosa Carbonell, later Síndic de Greuges of the university.

== Academics ==
Ramon Llull University comprises 13 schools and faculties and 3 university institutes:

- IQS School of Engineering
- IQS School of Management
- Blanquerna School of Psychology, Education and Sport Sciences
- Blanquerna School of Health Science
- Blanquerna School of Communication and International Relations
- ESADE Business School
- ESADE Law School
- Pere Tarrés Faculty of Social Education and Social Work
- Ebro Observatory University Institute
- Vidal i Barraquer University School of Mental Health
- Borja Institute of Bioethics
- ESDi Higher School of Design
- La Salle Campus Barcelona, comprising:
  - La Salle Digital Engineering School
  - La Salle International School of Commerce and Digital Economy
  - La Salle School of Architecture
  - La Salle Faculty of Philosophy

== University personnel ==
=== Notable faculty ===
- Santiago Niño Becerra-economics professor at the Chemical Institute of Sarrià.
- Begoña Román Maestre (born 1965), Spanish philosopher, university professor, researcher
- Esteve Almirall Mezquita, Spanish management scientist, academic

== Notable alumni ==
- Kurt Burneo (DrBA from ESADE Business School)-economics professor at the Pontifical Catholic University of Peru's Centrum Católica.
- Damià Calvet (Degree in Building Sciences and Technologies from Escuela Técnica Superior de Arquitectura La Salle)-Catalan Minister of Territory and Sustainability.
- Ramon Laguarta (BBA and MBA '85 from ESADE Business School)-chairman and chief executive officer of PepsiCo.
- Christian Rosa Olmo (MA in Advertising Strategies and Creativity from Facultad de Comunicación y Relaciones Internacionales Blanquerna)-Puerto Rican publicist and photographer.
- Albina Ruiz (PhD in Chemistry)-Peruvian environmentalist and engineer, Ciudad Saludable founder.
- Ester Vilarrubla Escales (Degree in Teaching Sciences from Facultad de Psicología, Ciencias de la Educación y del Deporte Blanquerna)-Andorran Minister of Education and Higher Education.

== See also ==
- Vives Network
