= Alcañices =

Alcañices Village of Alcañices
- County Capital and municipality
- Alcañices
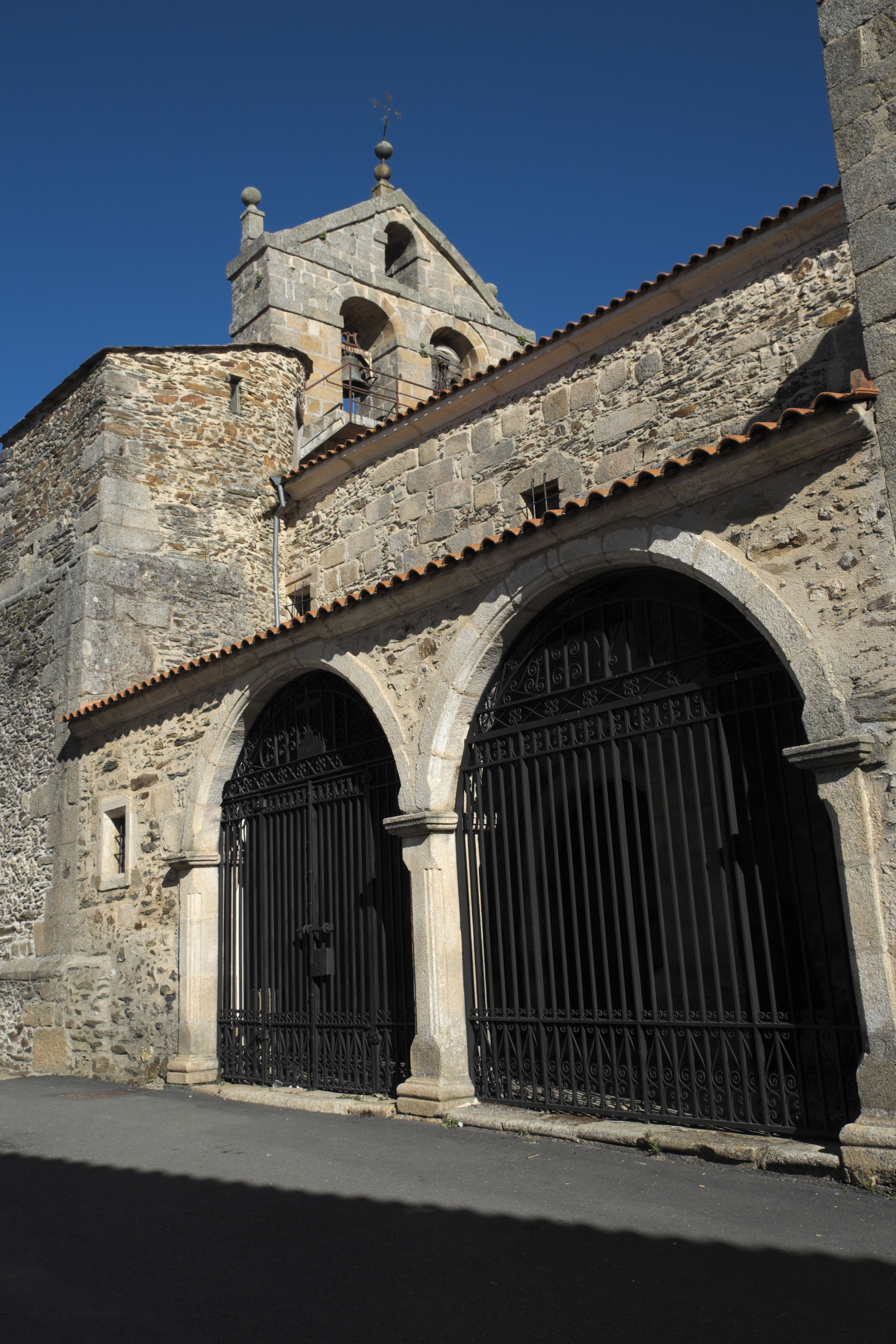
- Catholic Parish of Our Lady of the Assumption of Alcañices (13th century)

- Flag Coat of arms
- Motto: "Noble, Ilustre e Histórica Villa" ("Noble, Illustrious and Historical Village")
- Location in Spain
- Coordinates: 41°41′58.85″N 6°20′52.66″W
- Country: Spain
- Autonomous community: Castile and León
- Province: Zamora
- Comarca: Aliste
- Mancomunidad: Tierras de Aliste

Government
  - Mayor: David Carrión Galhardo (PP)

Area
  - Total: 54.76 km^{2} (21.14 sq mi)
- Elevation: 810 m (2,660 ft)

Population (2025-01-01)
  - Total: 1,062
  - Density: 19.39/km^{2} (50.23/sq mi)
- Demonym: Alcañizanos
- Time zone: UTC+1 (CET)
  - Summer (DST): UTC+2 (CEST)
- Postal code: 49500
- Climate: Csb
- Website: Official website

Alcañices (Portuguese: Alcanises) is a municipality located in the province of Zamora, Castile and León, Spain. It is very close to the Portugal-Spain border, not far from the Portuguese town of Bragança. In fact, the Village is especially remembered for being the seat of the Treaty of Alcañices that on 12 September 1297 defined the border between Portugal and the Crown of Castile, the oldest in Europe.

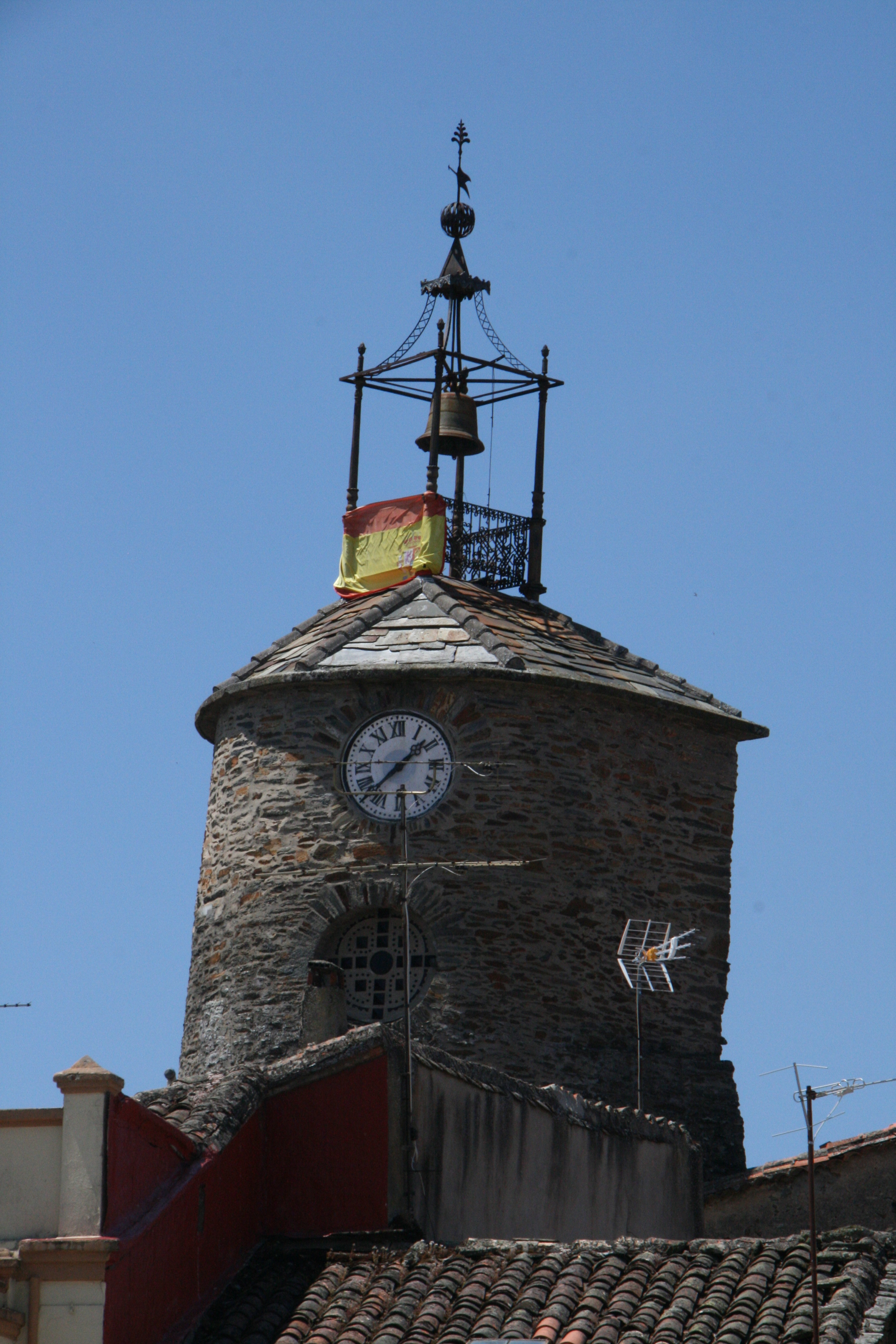
Main tower of the former fortress of Alcañices

Its name is of Arabic origin and means "the churches", although the origin of the town may have been a hillfort of the Zoelae.

During the Visigoths Enlisted as a free territory until in 586 King Liuvigild assigned it the Pagus Alistii to the Archbishop of Braga, which in 675 the Archbishop of Santiago de Compostela claimed as his own for not agreeing with the award.

In the Reconquest, Alfonso IX of León gave it to the Order of the Temple in 1175 for its repopulation, which in 1210 built a castle and 1255 erected a Commandery. Tradition says that Saint Francis of Assisi passed through Alcañices in 1214 when he was on a pilgrimage to Santiago de Compostela.

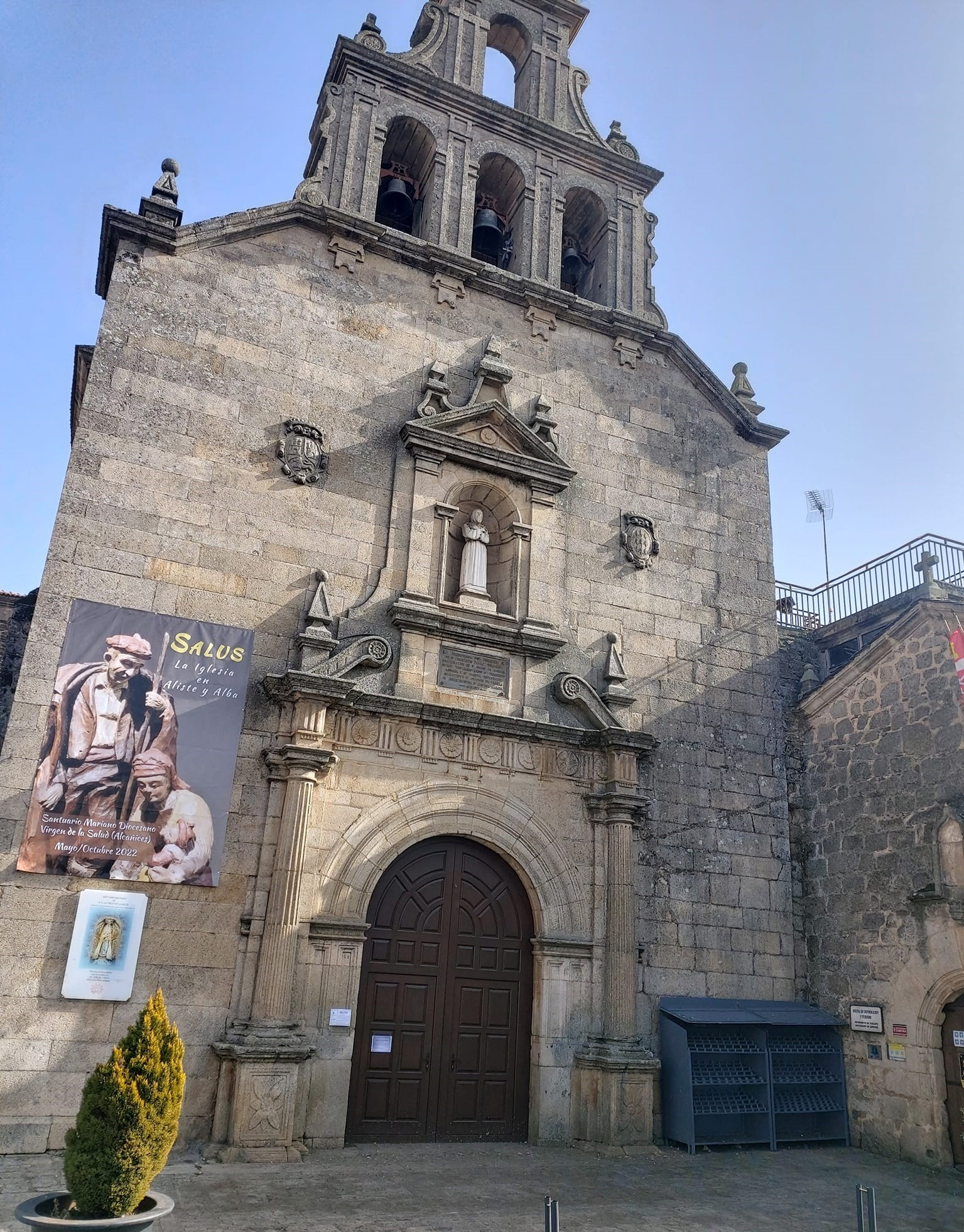
Catholic Sanctuary of Our Lady of Health of Alcañices, former Franciscan convent (16th century)

From 1371 to 1820 Alcañices was a manor town of the March of Alcañices, which in 1741 became part of the Ducal House of Alburquerque. During this time, the Marquises built a hospital for pilgrims, an alhóndiga for communal grain, a bridge, a series of fountains and several mills and promoted the creation of a Franciscan convent, which maintained that condition until its confiscation in 1848, as well as a palace within the fortress that is currently a residence for the elderly. In the local toponymy there are still references to the Prado del Marqués or the Huerta del Marqués. In addition, during this period part of the old wall was rebuilt, which had an active military use until 1817.

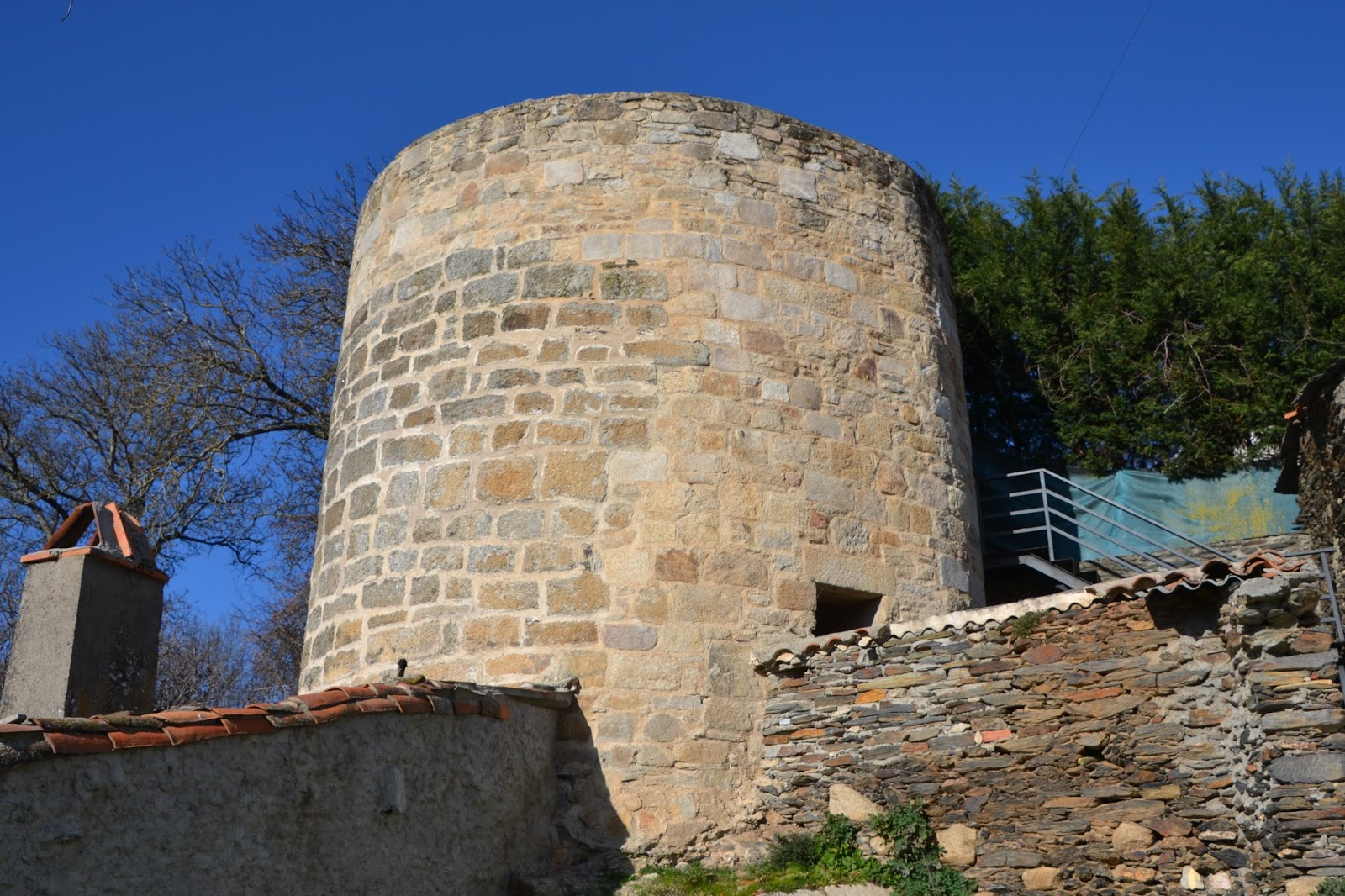

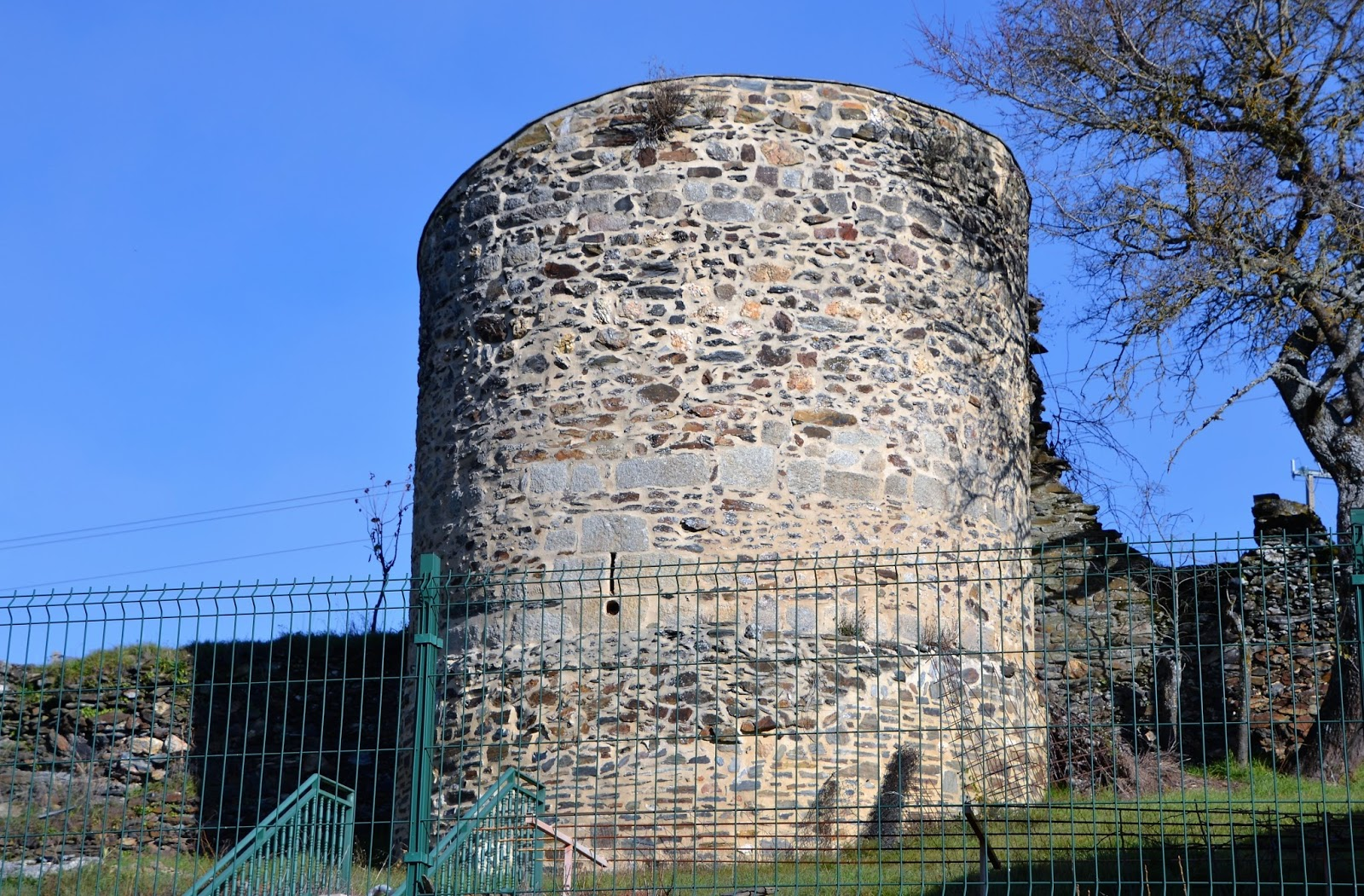

During the Modern Age, Alcañices was burned by John IV of Portugal in 1643 and was the scene of battles during the Spanish War of Independence, when in 1813 General La Croix surprised Mayor Echevarría and when Marshal Massená sent two divisions to subdue Alcañices and Puebla de Sanabria after the taking of Ciudad Rodrigo. Alcañices was the headquarters of the guerrilla party of Tomás García Vicente.

In Alcañices, until the expulsion of 1492, there was a Jewish quarter that was located outside the city walls, in the southwest of the Dentro la Villa neighborhood, on the sunny slope that looks towards the Fuente del Cañico. The popular name of the Tanneries still subsists in this area due to the leather tanning work carried out by the Jews, who had their own cemetery on the right bank of the river.

In the Royal Chancery of Valladolid, various lawsuits of nobility over Alcañices are preserved, such as Rodríguez (1553), Losada (1553), Pereira de Castro (1611), Gago (1714) and Puelles (1794). In the National Historical Archive there is that of Carrión (1757).

Five kings have visited Alcañices: Alfonso IX of León (1204), Ferdinand IV of Castile and Denis of Portugal (1297) and Juan Carlos I of Spain (1997), as well as - being Infante - Fernando III of Castile (1204). It has also been visited by the President of Portugal, Jorge Sampaio (1997), named Adoptive Son in 2006.

Alcañices has historically been granted the titles of Noble, Illustrious and Historic Village.

Noteworthy is the Route of the Mills and the Route of the Fountains, two modernist buildings (one of them by Francesc Ferriol), as well as various examples of traditional county architecture. The Quinta de los Templarios, an old Templar recreation estate, also remains from the Templar past. Tenant Pablo Muñoz de la Morena, hero of the Spanish War of Independence, is buried in its old parish cemetery.

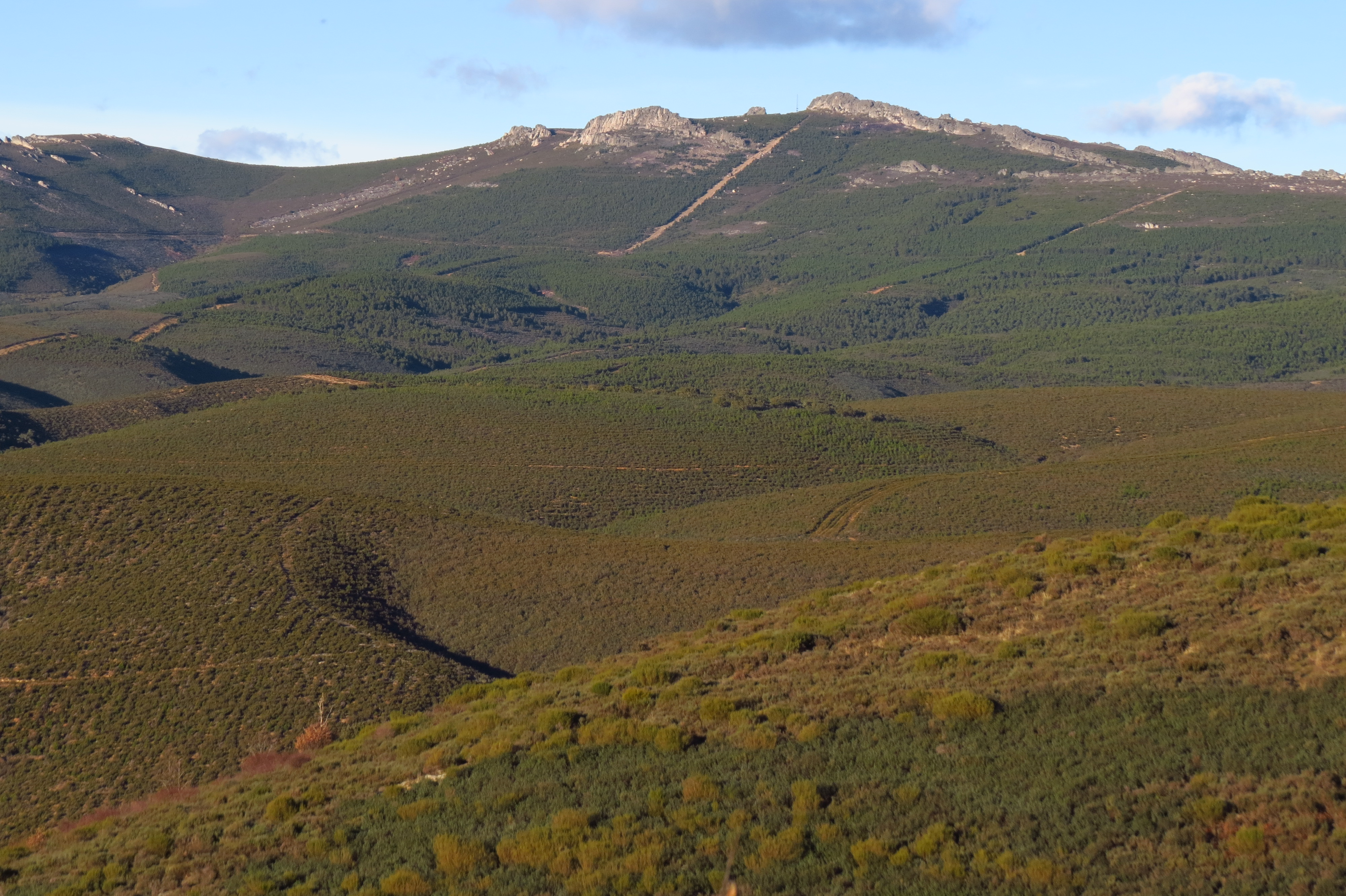

As for intangible heritage, the religious piece "Auto de los Reyes Magos" sung since time immemorial, of medieval origin. Since 1515, the village also has a Vera Cruz brotherhood, as well as three other brotherhoods and twelve civil associations, including the Manteos y Monteras de Alcañices Folklore School.

It is a central plateau, with undulating geography, alternating dry landscapes with slight mounds, the product of the passage from the Castilian countryside to the Leonese mountains. The soil corresponds to the siliceous zone in which clay abounds. The municipality belongs to the Meseta Ibérica transboundary biosphere reserve, a transboundary natural space between Spain and Portugal protected in 2015 by Unesco for the high level of conservation of its natural habitats and the species that inhabit it. Alcañices is located next to the Sierra de la Culebra, the largest wolf reserve in Europe.

== Town hall ==
Alcañices is home to the town hall of 4 villages:

- Alcañices (893 inhabitants, INE 2020).
- Alcorcillo (98 inhabitants, INE 2020).
- Vivinera (53 inhabitants, INE 2020).
- Santa Ana (21 inhabitants, INE 2020).

== See also ==
- Aliste (comarca)
