= El Toboso =

- Municipality
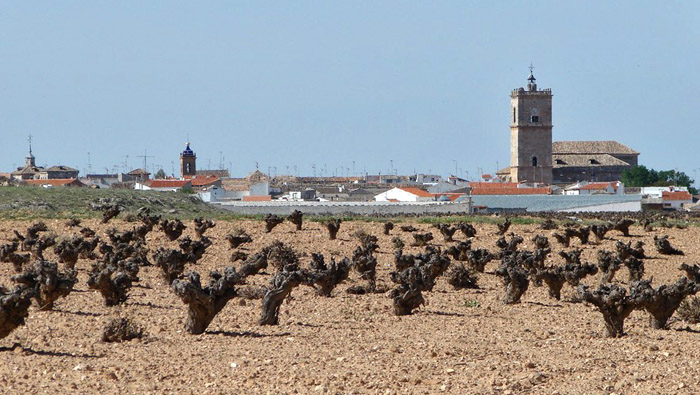

- Coat of arms

- Location within Castilla-La Mancha Location within Spain
- Coordinates: 39°31′5″N 2°59′53″W
- Country: Spain
- Autonomous community: Castilla–La Mancha
- Province: Toledo

Area
  - Total: 144.19 km^{2} (55.67 sq mi)
- Elevation: 635 m (2,083 ft)

Population (2025-01-01)
  - Total: 1,702
  - Density: 11.80/km^{2} (30.57/sq mi)
- Demonym(s): Tobeseños, Tobosinos, Tobosescos
- Time zone: UTC+1 (CET)
  - Summer (DST): UTC+2 (CEST)
- Postal code: 45820
- Website: eltoboso.es

El Toboso is a Spanish municipality located in the province of Toledo, autonomous community of Castilla–La Mancha. According to the 2009 data, El Toboso has a total population of 2,219 inhabitants. The economy of the town is based on wine production and cattle, and sheep.

== Placename ==
The placename is a derivative of the word toba (from vulgar Latin tōfa, Classical Latin tōfus), used in Spanish both for Scotch thistle and for porous limestone types, with the addition of the suffix -oso (relative to abundance). In the 1575 Relations, El Toboso is cited to be named because of the presence of thistle in the surroundings. Clemencín suggests instead a reference to porous stones (not common in the area).

== History ==
The place received a population charter in 1275. It received the privilege of township in 1338. El Toboso was one of the founding members of the Común de La Mancha, an institution related to the Order of Santiago set up in 1353 by Maester Fadrique with the aim of satisfying demands about a more equitable distribution of taxes from several localities. The town received a small number of Granadan Morisco families from Vélez Rubio who had been deported in 1571 in the wake of the Alpujarras Revolt.

== Main sights ==
- The Catholic church of San Antonio Abad, built in the 15th century.
- The convent of Trinitarias Recoletas, from the 17th century.
- The Cervantine Museum.
- The Museum of Dulcinea
- The lake of La Nava.

== In popular culture ==
El Toboso is famous for appearing in the novel Don Quixote by the Spanish writer Miguel de Cervantes, as the town in which the fictional character Dulcinea lives. The town also appears in Graham Greene's tribute Monsignor Quixote, where the heroes are a priest (supposedly a descendant of Cervantes's character), and the recently deposed Communist mayor of the town in the post-Franco era.

== Bibliography ==
- García Sánchez, Jairo Javier (2025). "El Toboso, análisis de un topónimo muy cervantino, junto a otros manchegos, a la luz del Toponomasticon Hispaniae" (PDF). In Sánchez Méndez, Juan Pedro; Padrón Castilla, Elena; Parro Gómez, Nerea (eds.). Sendas del hispanismo: márgenes, centros y convergencias. Actas del XXI Congreso de la Asociación Internacional de Hispanistas (Neuchatel 2023). Iberoamericana Vervuert. pp. 1–11. doi:10.31819/9783968696935_016.
- Ghazali, María (2023). "Los moriscos de El Toboso. El proceso inquisitorial de Francisco Ximénez (1603-1605), ¿un proceso político en vísperas de la expulsión de 1609?". In Andrés Robres, Fernando; Pardo Molero, Juan Francisco; Lomas Cortés, Manuel; Pomara Saverino, Bruno (eds.). Poderosos, marginados y gente común: una historia de todos. Homenaje a Rafael Benítez Sánchez-Blanco. Albatros. ISBN 978-84-7274-402-8.
- Porras Arboledas, Pedro Andrés (1995). "La repoblación de La Mancha santiaguista en tiempos de Alfonso XI". Cuadernos de Historia del Derecho. 2. Madrid: Ediciones Complutense. ISSN 1133-7613.
- Jiménez de Gregorio, Fernando (1999). La Mancha toledana (PDF). Toledo: Diputación Provincial. ISBN 84-87103-92-8.
