= Pablo Muñoz de la Morena =

Don Pablo Muñoz de la Morena

Hero of Peninsular War
- Monarch: Fernando VII

Personal details
- Born: Pablo Muñoz de la Morena y Martínez-Zarco; 7 July 1769 El Toboso, Spain
- Died: 9 September 1848 (aged 79) Alcañices, Spain
- Resting place: Alcañices, Spain
- Spouse: 2
- Children: 6
- Profession: Militar
- Awards: Cross of the Battle of Mengíbar
- Nickname: Pablo Amaro / Tennant Muñoz de la Morena

Military service
- Allegiance: Kingdom of Spain
- Branch/service: Spanish Army
- Years of service: 31
- Rank: Tennant
- Unit: Regimiento de Dragones de Lusitania Regimiento de Milicias Provinciales de Alcázar de San Juan
- Commands: Special Operations Command in Villelongue-dels-Monts; Head of the Company of Hunters; Commander of Arms of El Toboso
- Battles/wars: War of the Pyrenees; War of the Oranges; Peninsular War

Teniente Pablo Muñoz de la Morena y Martínez-Zarco (7 July 1769 – 9 September 1848) was a Spanish cavalry officer during the Napoleonic Wars, considered a Hero of the Peninsular War, who served also with distinction in the Spanish-French (1793-1795) and Spanish-Portugal (1801) wars. King Fernando VII decorated him in the battle of Mengíbar (1808)

== Early life ==
He was born in El Toboso, the village of Dulcinea in Cervantes's Don Quixote, within a noble family living there since the 15th century, owners of 8,692 hectares.

He was the descendant of major Bartolomé Martínez de la Morena, crossbowmen of Emperor Carlos I, Dr Esteban Martínez-Zarco y Muñoz de Horcajada, rector del Collegio di Spagna (1555-1561) and Bachelor Diego Ortiz-Vivanco de la Plaza y Martínez de la Morena, member of the Order of Santiago. In 1801 he married his cousin Juana-María Cano Coronado and later, in 1826, he married Basilisa Fernández Carrasco, both with Royal permission. Between 1820 and 1823 he was appointed trustee of the City Council of El Toboso and local Commander of Arms. He died in Alcañices in 1848, where he had gone to spend a season with his youngest son, being buried in the parish cemetery.

== Military career ==
He entered the Army in 1785, being assigned to the regiment of provincial militias of Alcázar de San Juan, being a contemporary of José de San Martín, since he was born nine years before and died two years before, fought exactly in the same three wars.

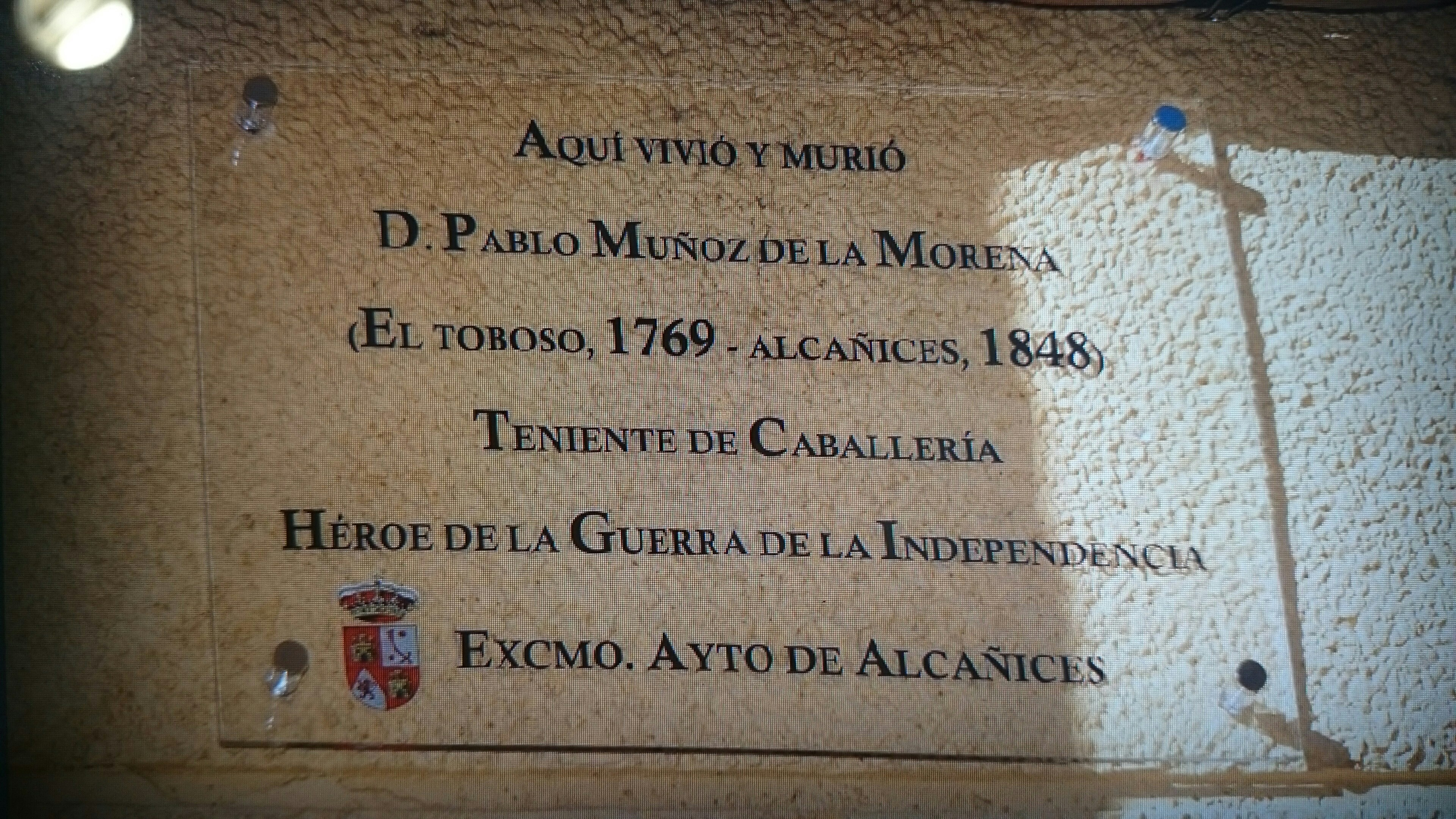

Between 1793 and 1794 he participated in the War of the Pyrenees, fighting in the battles of Commanderie du Mas Deu, Trouillas, Elne, Laroque-des-Albères and Opoul-Périllos; the taking of the castles of Banyuls-dels-Aspres, Prats-de-Mollo-la-Preste and Thuir; and the site of the castles of Collioure and Miles. He stood out in the battle against the French cavalry in the Champ de la Trompette and Saint-Génis-des-Fontaines. At the same time, he voluntarily headed the command that took the battery of Villelongue-dels-Monts, facilitating the fall of the castle of Montesquieu-des-Albères.

In 1794 he participated in the battle of the Paso de las Dos Hermanas, in Navarre.

In 1801, in the War of the Oranges, he actively participated in the taking of Juromenha and the site of Campo Maior.

In the Peninsular War, his first action was the siege, capture and surrender of the French squad in Trocadero. Later he took an active part in the battles of Jaén and Mengíbar, as well as Andújar, Bailén, Somosierra, Valdepeñas Ocaña, Montizón and Sagunto. He broke the Valencia site twice.

He obtained his retirement by Royal Office of 1812. His decorations are today deposited in the town halls of Alcañices and El Toboso.

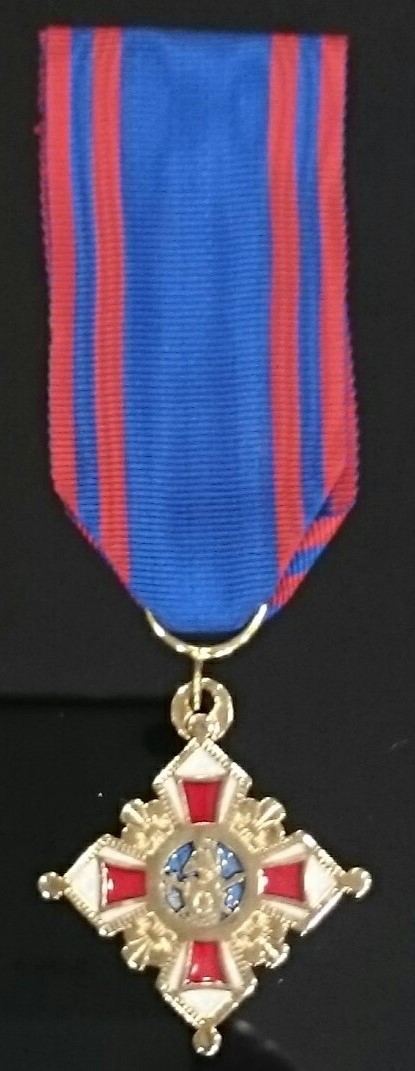
