= University of Rovira i Virgili =

Public university in southern Catalonia, Spain

Coordinates: 41.1197°N 1.2605°E

- Universitat Rovira i Virgili
- Motto: Sapientiae Liberi Libertati Sapientes (for wisdom free, for freedom wise)
- Type: Public
- Established: 1991
- Affiliations: Vives Network / Aurora, European University Alliance
- Rector: Josep Pallarès Marzal
- Administrative staff: ~766 (2023)
- Students: 16,590 (2024-25)
- Other students: 1,284 full-time teaching and reseach staff members (2023)
- Location: Various cities in the Province of Tarragona (Tarragona, Reus, Vila-seca, Tortosa, El Vendrell, Vilafranca del Penedès) Catalonia, Spain
- Campus: 6
- Website: www.urv.cat/en

The University of Rovira i Virgili (Catalan: Universitat Rovira i Virgili; IPA: [uniβəɾsiˈtad ruˈβiɾəj βiɾˈʒili], often shortened as URV) is a Spanish public university located in Catalonia's province of Tarragona. The URV has twelve faculties and schools throughout the region, specifically in the cities of Tarragona, Reus, Tortosa, Vila-seca, el Vendrell, and Vilafranca del Penedès, as well as additional affiliated centres. There are nearly 60 undergraduate programmes and 60 master's degrees (many of which are inter-university), a doctoral programme, and lifelong learning courses.

Created in 1991 by the Parliament of Catalonia from the preexisting schools and faculties, and was named after Antoni Rovira i Virgili (a local writer, historian, and politician who held the office of president of the Parliament of Catalonia in exile, during the dictatorship), the university states among its objectives to contribute to the social and economic development of the Tarragona region.

== History ==
=== Early modern Universitas Tarraconensis (1572-1717) ===
University education in the Tarragona area goes back to the 16th century, when Cardinal Gaspar Cervantes de Gaeta founded a university to teach Grammar, the Arts, and Theology, called "Universitas Tarraconensis" (Tarragona University).

Similar to other teaching centres in Catalonia, this institution was practically wiped out by the reprisals of Philip V after the War of Succession and the Nueva Planta decrees.

=== Contemporary university ===
==== Learning centres ====
University education did not return to the Tarragona area until the second half of the 20th century, when different different paths converged to form the premises of what would later become the URV.

In 1956, the technical college "Universidad Laboral" was created by the francoist Ministry of Employment, starting its teachings in 1961–62 with specialties in mechanical, electrical and chemical engineering. It depended on the Terrassa School of Engineering. In 1972, the title of "Engineer" was changed to "Technical Engineer", and the Universitat Laboral ceased to depend on Terrassa and dropped its mechanical and engineering courses; and in 1973, the institution became part of the Universitat Politècnica de Catalunya as its "University School of Industrial Engineering."

==== Delegations of the Universidad de Barcelona ====
In 1971, the Universitat de Barcelona set up local branches of its faculties of Philosophy & Letters, and of Sciences in the city of Tarragona. As early as 1972, a request was made to convert these branches into a university college so that they could provide complete first-cycle courses. In 1977, medical courses began in Reus, and in 1983 the Spanish Parliament established the Faculty of Philosophy and Arts and the Faculty of Chemistry in Tarragona.

==== Creation of the Universitat Rovira i Virgili ====
Finally, in 1991, the Catalan Parliament created the Universitat Rovira I Virgili from the university centers already existing in Reus and Tarragona and which depended on the Universitat de Barcelona. Since then, the university has gradually increased the number of courses on offer by creating such new campuses as Sescelades and Catalunya in Tarragona, and Bellissens in Reus.

== Administration ==
=== Rectors ===
The first senate chose the philologist Joan Martí i Castell as its first rector. The first statutes were approved. The first Board of Trustees was chaired by Josep Maria Freixas. In 1994, the Ombuds Office was set up to defend the rights of the university community and self-regulate the institution.

The rector is the highest academic authority of the University and is its representative. He or she has all the powers that are not expressly attributed to other bodies.

Since its creation in 1991, this position has been held by the following people:

- Joan Martí i Castell: 1992-1998
- Lluís Arola i Ferrer: 1998-2006
- Francesc Xavier Grau i Vidal: 2006-2014
- Josep Anton Ferré Vidal: 2014-2018
- María José Figueras Salvat: 2018-2022
- Josep Pallarès Marzal: 2022 - present

== Research and teachings ==
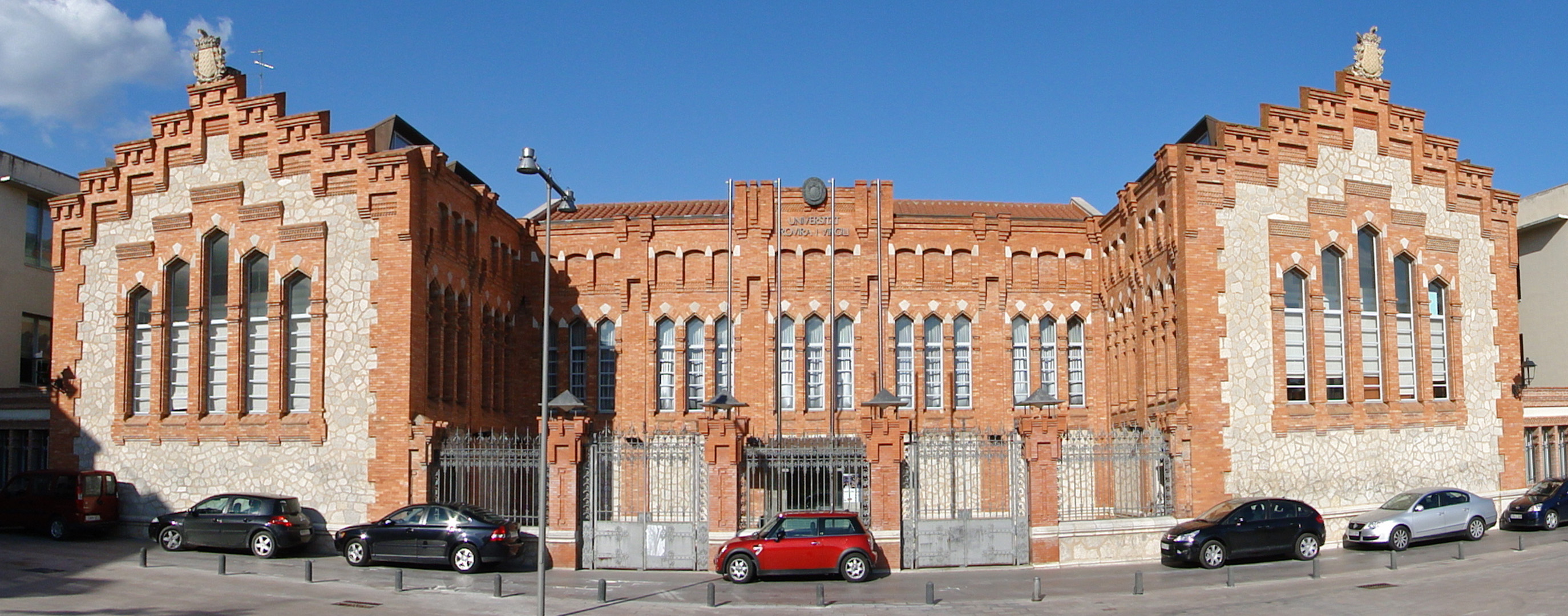
University of Rovira i Virgili, Tarragona

According to Nature Index, the largest area of high-quality research output from URV are in the fields of chemistry, health sciences, social sciences.

=== Degrees proposed ===
- 58 bachelor's degrees
- 58 university master's degrees
- 26 doctoral degrees
- 22 URV-specific postgraduate degrees

=== Affiliated and participatory research structures ===
- Catalan Institute of Classical Archaeology (ICAC)

The Catalan Institute of Classical Archaeology is a public research centre created in the year 2000 by the Catalan Government and the Universitat Rovira i Virgili, with the participation of the Inter-university Council of Catalonia. Its activities focus on research, postgraduate education, and dissemination regarding classical civilization and culture.

- Institute of Chemical Research of Catalonia (ICIQ)

ICIQ is a public research foundation focused on chemistry, sustainable catalysis, renewable energy, and molecular medicine. Since 2014, ICIQ has been awarded three Severo Ochoa Excellence Accreditations.

- Catalan Institute of Human Palaeoecology and Social Evolution (IPHES)

The Catalan Institute of Human Palaeoecology and Social Evolution is a transdisciplinary, advanced research institute that was founded in 2006. Its objectives are to carry out scientific research programmes in the earth and life sciences, promote their socialization and use the results in prospective social research of an evolutionary nature.

- Pere Virgili Institute for Health Research (IISPV)

The Pere Virgili Institute for Health Research (IISPV) conducts health and biomedical research and offers research training through collaboration agreements with health institutions and the Universitat Rovira i Virgili.

- Catalonia Institute for Energy Research (IREC)

The URV is a member of the IREC board, the aim of which is to contribute to the sustainable development of society and increase the competitiveness of companies through innovation and the development of new technological products. It is also involved in medium- and long-term research, and scientific development and technological knowledge in the field of energy.

=== Rankings ===
University rankings

Global – Overall
- ARWU World: 701–800 (2024)
- QS World: 771-780 (2026)
- THE World: 601-800 (2025)

- World University Rankings Young: 112 (2024)
- Times Higher Education Impact: 101-200 (2024)

== See also ==
- Xarxa Vives d'Universitats
- List of early modern universities in Europe
