= Chemical Institute of Sarrià =

Coordinates: 41°24′11.45″N 2°7′11.22″E

- Institut Químic de Sarrià
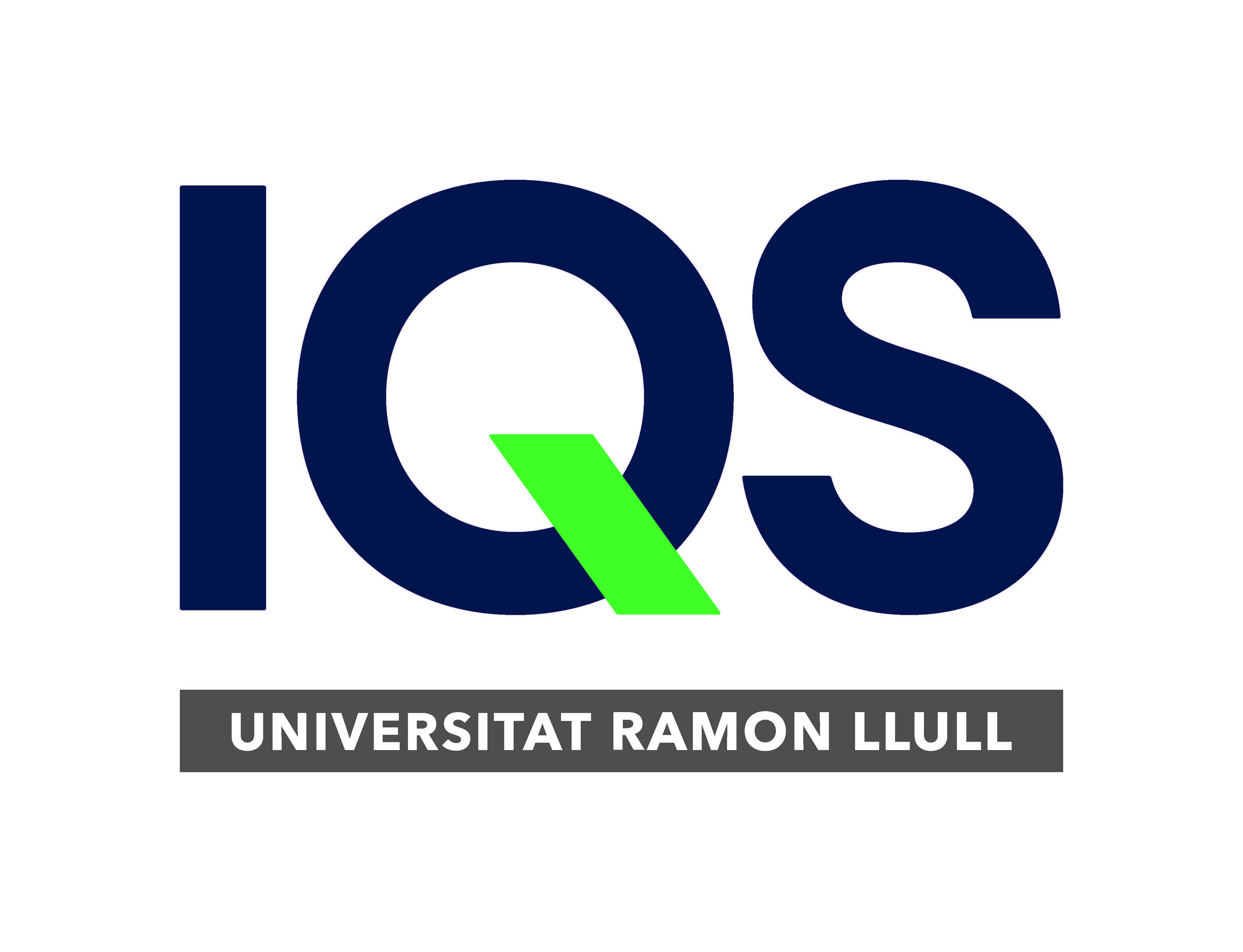
- Abbreviation: IQS Barcelona
- Predecessor: Chemical Laboratory of the Ebro
- Established: August 15, 1905; 121 years ago
- Type: Private research university
- Location: Via Augusta, 390, Barcelona, Spain
- Accreditation: ABET, AACSB
- Parent organization: Ramon Llull University
- Website: IQS Barcelona

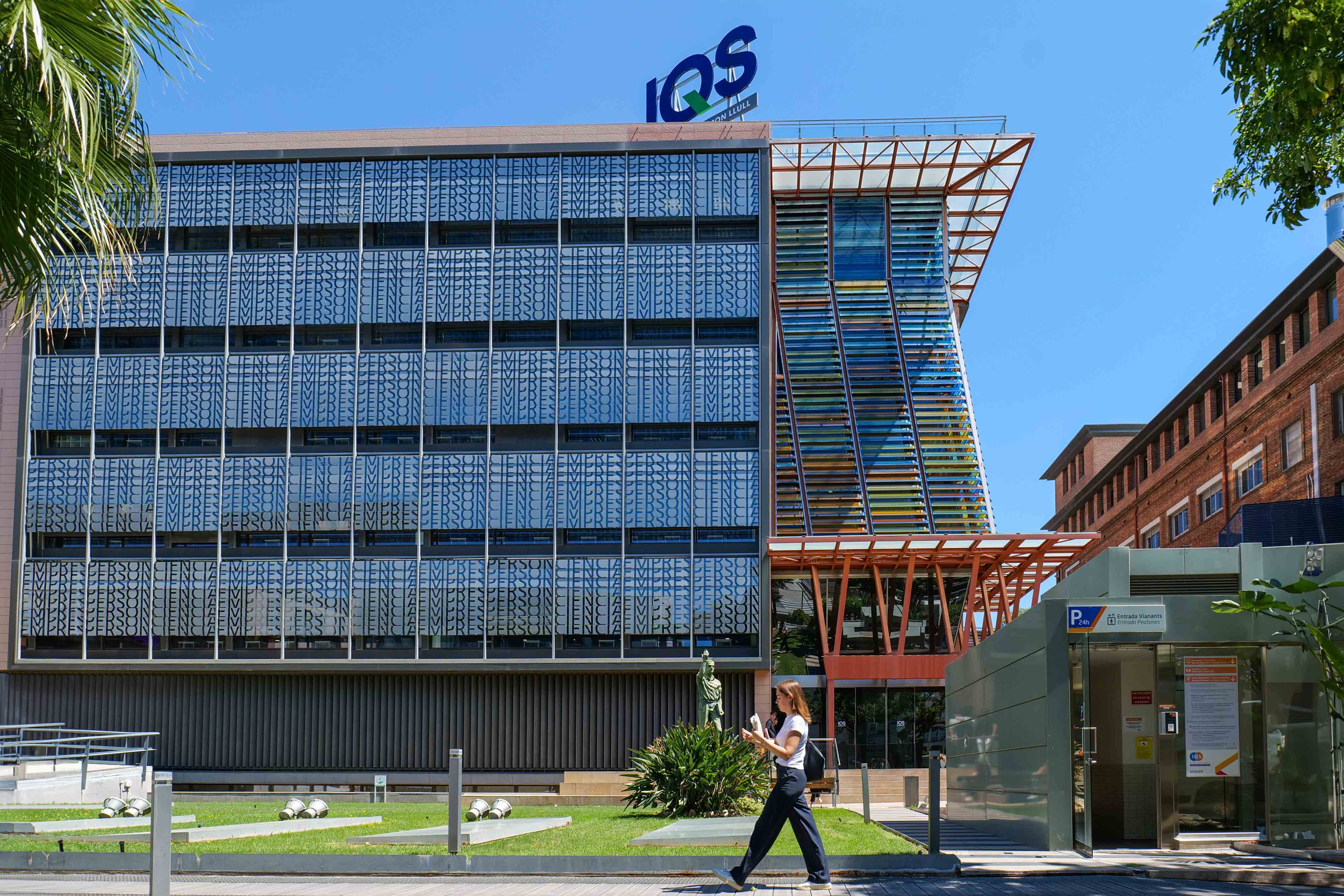

Chemical Institute of Sarrià (Catalan: Institut Químic de Sarrià, Spanish: Instituto Químico de Sarriá, IQS) is an educational institution that manages two schools of the Ramon Llull University: IQS School of Engineering and IQS School of Management. Both schools offer masters and doctorate programs.

== History ==
Eduard Vitòria i Miralles founded Chemical Laboratory of the Ebre at Roquetes, Tarragona, in August 1905. In 1916 he moved it next to St. Ignatius College in Sarrià, where it acquired the name Chemical Institute of Sarrià. In 1965 the Ministry of Education recognized it as a State Higher Technical Education Center. In 1984 it ceased to be a legally dependent centre of the Society of Jesus and became a foundation governed by a board of trustees. On 1 March 1990 it joined with other institutions in becoming Ramon Llull University, the first private university in Catalonia as approved by the Parliament of Catalonia on 10 May 1991, then called the IQS School of Engineering and IQS School of Management (formerly School of Economics ADE).

In 2005, IQS received the Gold Medal of the city of Barcelona and the Creu de Sant Jordi distinction of the Government of Catalonia, in recognition of their teaching and research. In 2010 construction began on the new IQS School of Management building, which was officially opened by the then Prince of Asturias and Girona on 12 December 2012. In 2013, IQS School of Engineering began offering a degree in biotechnology. Subsequently, the degree in Biomedical Sciences was added and, in 2025, the degree in Applied Mathematics.

== IQS School of Engineering ==
IQS School of Engineering offers studies in Chemistry, Chemical Engineering, Industrial Engineering, Biotechnology, Bioengineering, Pharmacy and Applied Mathematics.

It has signed collaboration agreements with different companies, as well as agreements with several prestigious universities such as MIT (Massachusetts Institute of Technology).

It holds the Accreditation Board for Engineering and Technology (ABET) accreditation in the degrees of Chemical Engineering and Industrial Engineering.

== IQS School of Management ==
IQS School of Management offers programs in Business Administration and Management, International Business, Marketing, Circular Economy, and Accounting and Finance.

All IQS School of Management programs are accredited by the (AACSB).

== See also ==
- List of Jesuit sites
