= Aliste (comarca) =

Coordinates: 41°47′N 6°18′W

Location of Aliste comarca in Zamora Province

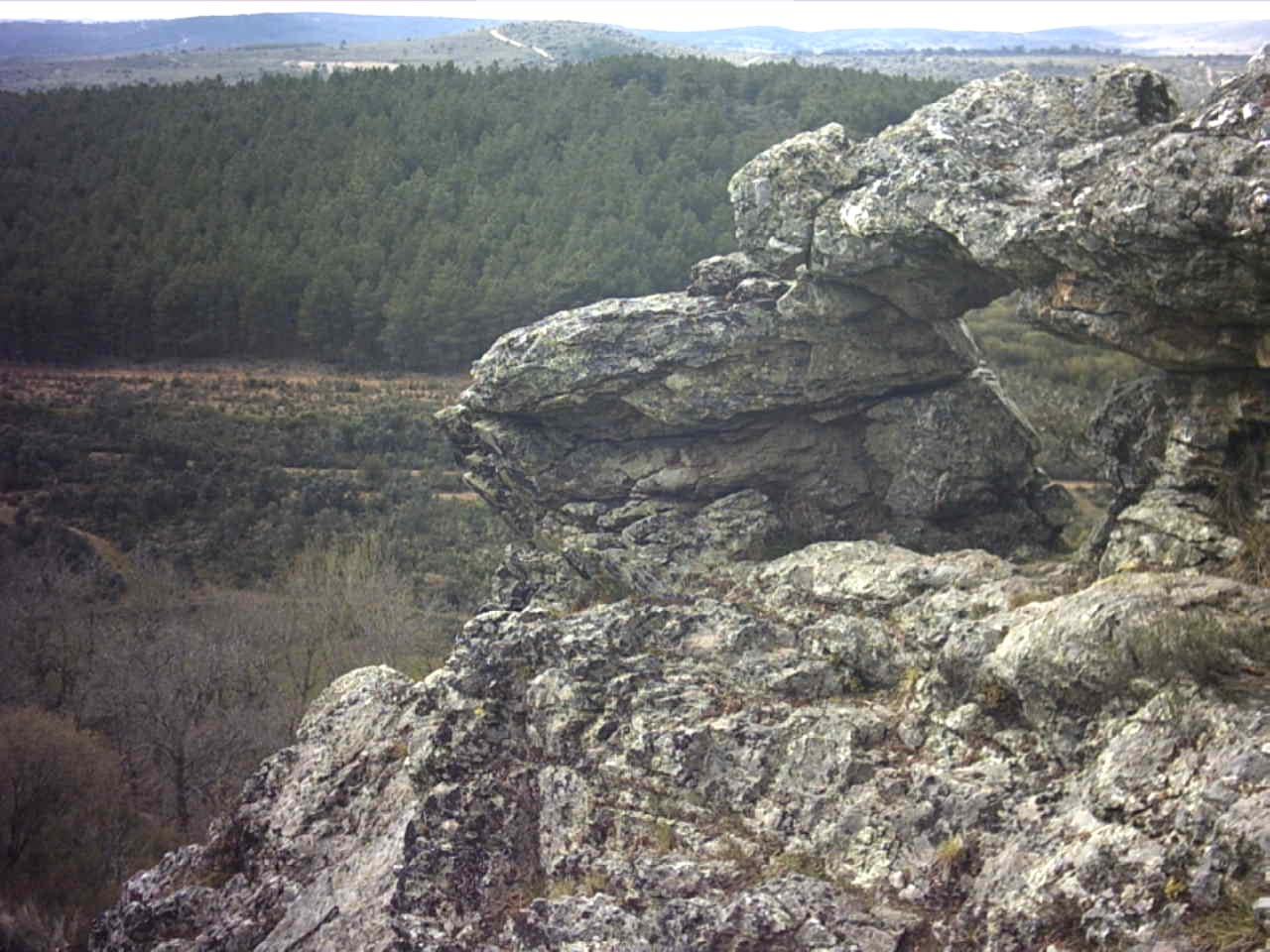
Peña Furada in Sierra de la Culebra near Gallegos del Campo.

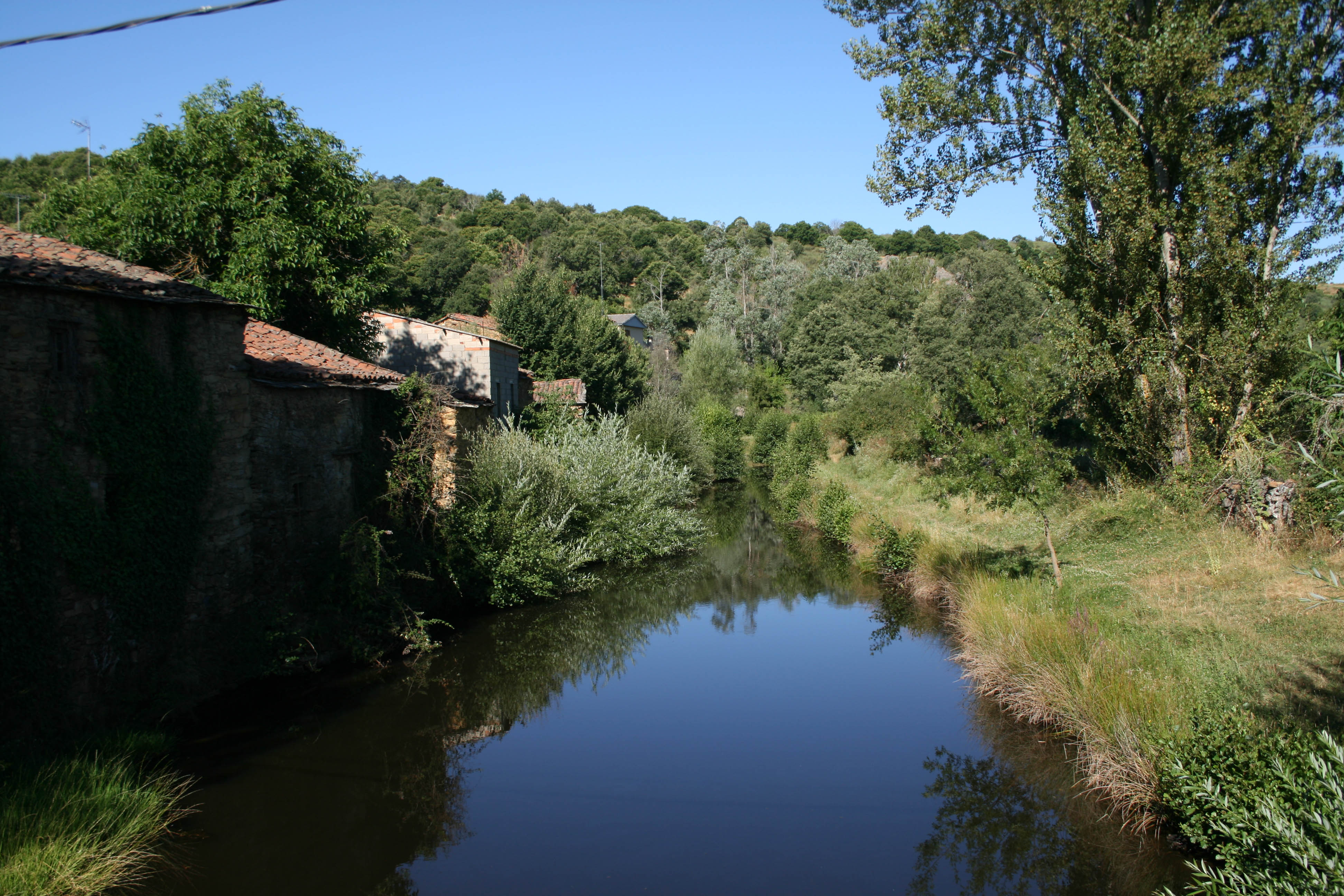
Aliste River near Mahide

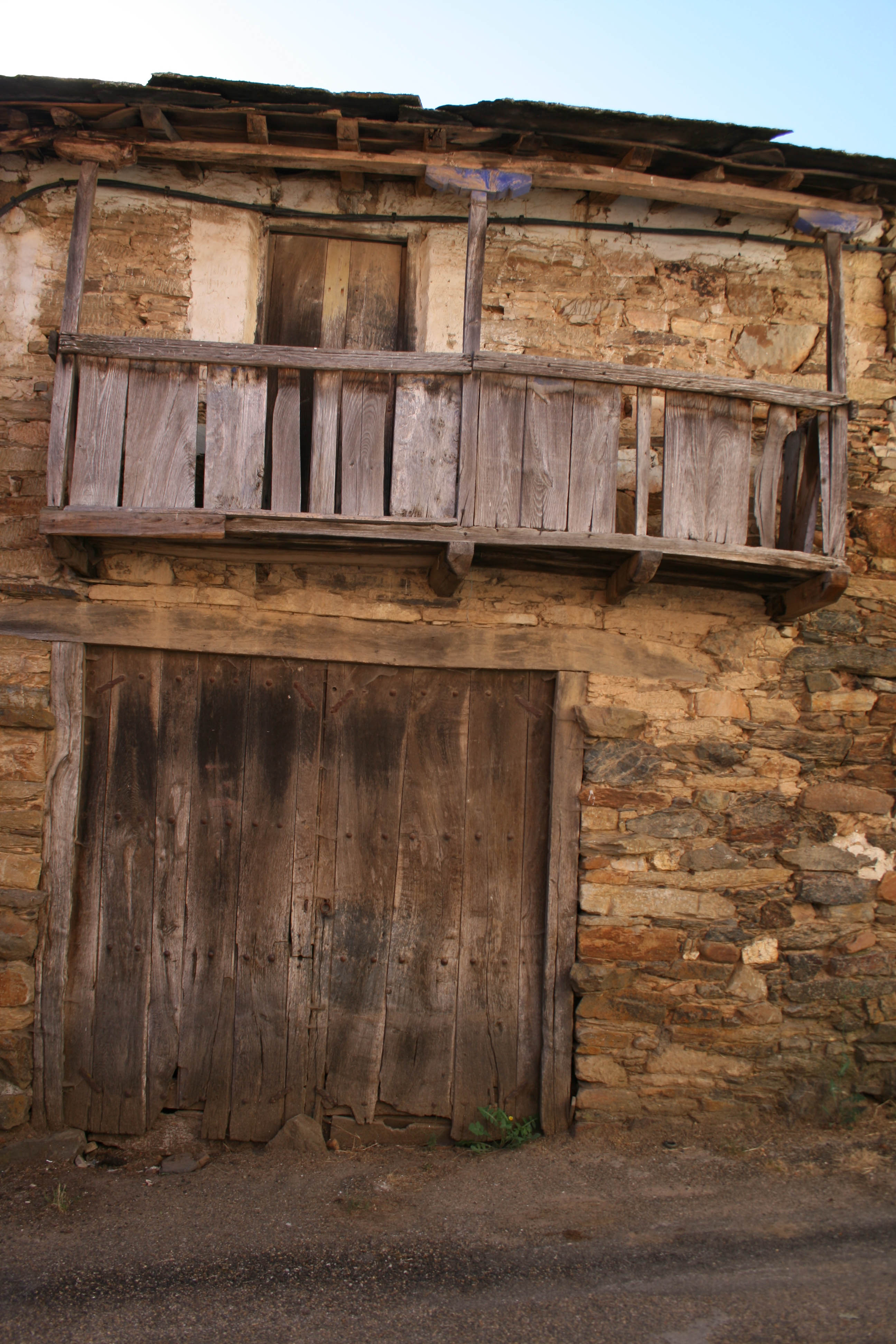
Traditional architecture in Aliste.

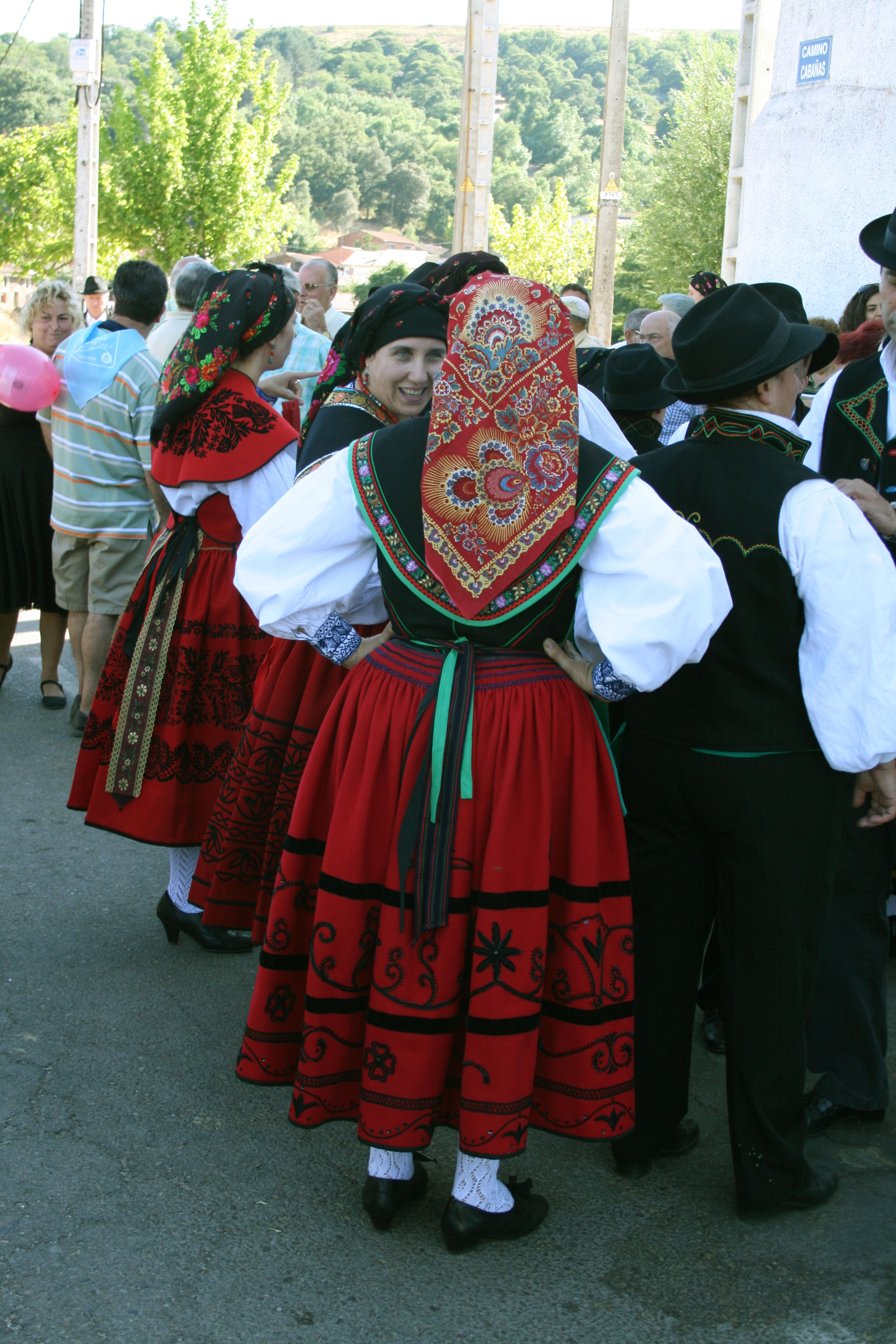
Local women in regional costume

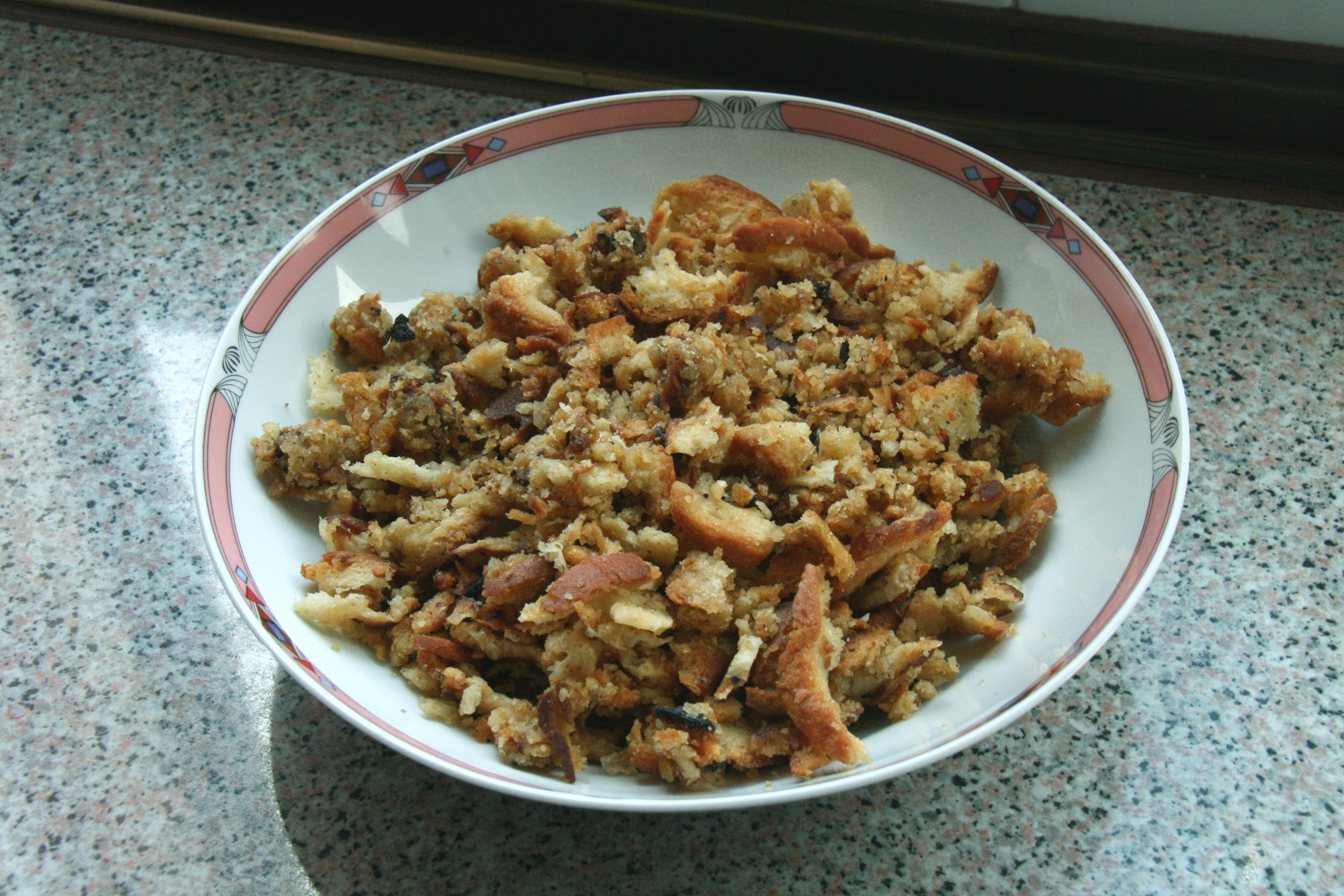
Turriyones, a local dish

Aliste is a comarca located in the west of the province of Zamora, Castile and León, Spain, bordering with Portugal in the west and in the south. It covers 193,883 hectares. Aliste is an area that has preserved a rich cultural and ethnological tradition through years of isolation. Aliste is perhaps the poorest zone within the province, the economy of this deeply rural comarca is based on cattle rearing. The origin of the name Aliste appears as Alesti in a 9th Century manuscript, referring to the trees (alisos) which can be seen on the banks of what is now called the Aliste River.

The Aliste comarca is one of the few areas in Western Europe having a sizeable population of wild wolves living in the Sierra de la Culebra mountain range in the northwest of the comarca.

== Geography ==
The terrain is rolling and hilly, alternating with dry landscapes typical to neighboring regions of Portugal. It is bisected by the River Aliste, near which is abundant vegetation, oak trees, and brush. There is a national game reserve located in the Sierra de la Culebra (65,981 hectares), which has the largest population of wolves in the Iberian Peninsula.

== Municipalities and towns ==
Abejera de Tábara; Alcañices; Alcorcillo; Arcillera; Bercianos de Aliste; Bermillo de Alba; Boya; Brandilanes de Aliste; Cabañas de Aliste; Campogrande de Aliste; Castro de Alcañices; Ceadea; Domez de Alba; El Poyo; Ferreras de Abajo; Figueruela de Abajo; Figueruela de Arriba; Flechas; Flores de Aliste; Fonfría; Fornillos de Aliste; Fradellos; Gallegos del Campo	Gallegos del Río; Grisuela; Latedo; Lober; La Torre de Aliste; Mahide; Matellanes; Mellanes; Moldones; Moveros; Nuez de Aliste; Olmillos de castro; Palazuelo de las Cuevas; Pobladura de Aliste; Puercas de Aliste; Rabanales; Rábano de Aliste; Ribas; Riofrío de Aliste; Riomanzanas; Salto de Castro; Samir de los Caños; San Blas	San Cristóbal de Aliste; San Juan del Rebollar; San Mamed; San Martín de Tábara; San Martín del Pedroso; San Pedro de las Herrerías; San Vicente de la Cabeza; San Vitero; Santa Ana; Sarracín de Aliste; Sejas de Aliste; Tola; Tolilla; Trabazos; Ufones; Valer de Aliste; Vega de Nuez; Villarino de Cebal; Villarino de Manzanas; Villarino Tras la Sierra; Viñas de Aliste; Vivinera

== Culture ==
This comarca has various examples of Romanic art in its churches, which can be seen in Tabara, or the clocktower of Alcañices, as well as the castle of Riomanzanas. There are also historical sites associated with the Templars.

=== Cuisine ===
The comarca has a diverse regional cuisine, with a famous breed of local cattle known as Ternera de Aliste. Other popular foods include pork, which is slaughtered in local ritual festivals believed to originate with the early Celtic inhabitants of the region.

=== Music ===
There are various local music traditions, often employing the bagpipe, flute, and drum, as is common throughout Zamora. The gaita alistana, a type of traditional bagpipe, is associated with the region, and bears some resemblance to the neighboring gaita transmontana and gaita sanabresa.

On some Sundays, and for holidays and festivals of patron saints the locals perform spectacles and traditional dances, such as the jota. el que toca el tamboril acompaña la gaita con el canto de letras adaptadas al ritmo del baile.

=== Fragment of a typical jota ===
Tienes unos ojos, niña, que te lloran aguardiente, pero tienes una cara, que le dice al sol detente. Ay, ay, ay, ay, ay, los de Santander Se van a marchar, No van a volver. No van a volver, No van a volver, Ay, ay, ay, ay, ay, los de Santander. Todo lo que a mi me pasa se lo cuentan a mi madre, como si mi madre fuera, cuchillo para matarme.	Tienes unos ojos niña, que te los estoy mirando, que cuando miran a un hombre, le quitan de vida un año. Como quieres que te quiera, si aun a mi me están queriendo, como quieres que yo ame, dos corazones a un tiempo. Manojito de alfileres, me parecen tus pestañas, que cada vez que me miras, se me clavan en el alma. Te tienes por mozo rico y a las mozas pones faltas,	también a los mozos ricos les suelen dar calabazas. Un rosal cría una rosa, una maceta un clavel, un padre cría una hija sin saber para quién es. A tus ojitos azules, no los quiero ver llorar, que el cielo se pone triste, cuando anuncia tempestad. Yo te quise y tu a mi no, yo te amo y tu me aborreces, yo te estoy queriendo a ti, aunque tu a mi me desprecies.

=== Customs ===
The customs of Aliste are based on long history and legend, with the annual slaughter of livestock (matanza) being a major cultural event.

=== The Alistano language ===
Alistano is not properly a dialect, but may be considered a variant of Leonese, with a distinct personality influenced by Galician-Portuguese, due to geographic proximity. Gómez Moreno states that the Alistanos "may even belong to the Portuguese race, given the clues remaining in their language."

Alistano also shows the influence of Galician, as do many aspects of Alistan culture, which has at least twenty centuries of cultural intercourse with Galicia. The future of Alistano is difficult, but it is not definitively bound for extinction. It persists primarily amongst the elderly. The influx of the Leonese, increased urbanization (clashing with the primarily rural culture of Aliste), mass media, and the use of Castilian as the official language and language of education, are inexorable factors influencing the decline of Alistano.

Example of a dialogue in Alistano: ¿A onde fuest'ayer?; Fuey a rega las patatas, al huertu que linda cun el vuestru.; Pus, p'e qu'habiés arregau hacié poco.; Si, hacié dos semanas, peru las patatas estaban ya turradicas.; Es que cun estas calores...; Y tu, ¿cuandu piensas dir a rega las tuyas?; Nu sey on t'avia... Cun estu de mi padre...; ¿Le pas'algu?; Lleva una temporada muy estropiau.	Spanish translation: ¿Adonde fuiste ayer?; Fui a regar las patatas, al huerto que linda con el vuestro.; Pues, me parece que habías regado hace poco.; Si, hace dos semanas, pero las patatas estaban ya muy secas.; Es que con esta calor...; Y tu, ¿cuándo piensas ir a regar las tuyas?; No sé todavía... Con esto de mi padre...; ¿Le pasa algo?; Lleva una temporada muy enfermo.

== Bibliography ==
- Costumbres comunales de Aliste, Santiago Méndez Plaza, Madrid, 1900.
- Historias de la Villa de Nuez y otras de Aliste y Alba, Gabriel Guarrido Casado, 1966.
- Clima de la provincia de Zamora, Garmendia.J. (1986):. Publicación I.O.A.T.O. Salamanca.
- El habla de Tierra de Aliste, José María Baz, Madrid: Consejo Superior de Investigaciones Científicas, 1967
