= Aliste =

Aliste may refer to several municipalities in comarca of Aliste, in the Zamora province of northern Spain:

- Mahide de Aliste
- Rábano de Aliste
- Riofrío de Aliste

Alternately, it may refer to a comarca (shire) within Zamora:

- Aliste (shire)
