= Francisco de Berganza =

Fray Francisco de Berganza y Arce (10 April 1663 – 29 April 1738), better known as Padre Berganza, was a Spanish Benedictine monk and medievalist. Marcelino Menéndez Pelayo called him la lumbrera intelectual de su siglo ("the brightest intellect of his age").

He was the son of Francisco de Berganza and Jacinta de Arce, baptised in the parish church of Santibánez de Zarzaguda, though his family was from Gumiel de Izán. On 5 February 1682 he took the Benedictine habit at the monastery of San Pedro de Cardeña, making his profession a short while later, on 21 March. He was shortly thereafter sent to study at San Vicente de Salamanca, where he spent twelve years before returning to Cardeña. There he became chief preacher and finally abbot, from 1721 to 1725. He died suddenly during suppertime at the convent of San Martín de Madrid.

As a historian he was innovative and modern, rejecting traditional methods of historical inquiry, he turned to the direct study of the documents. His Antigüedades de España brought to light many documents, including many from the archives of Cardeña, that had not until then been publicised. It was published in two volumes, the second at Madrid from 1719–21. He uncovered many forgeries that exposed traditional narrative of the origins of Castile and the unity of Spain. Posthumously at Madrid in 1729 was published his Ferreras convencido, a revision of the history of Ferreras.
