= Hernán Rodríguez =

Chilean footballer (1933–2026)

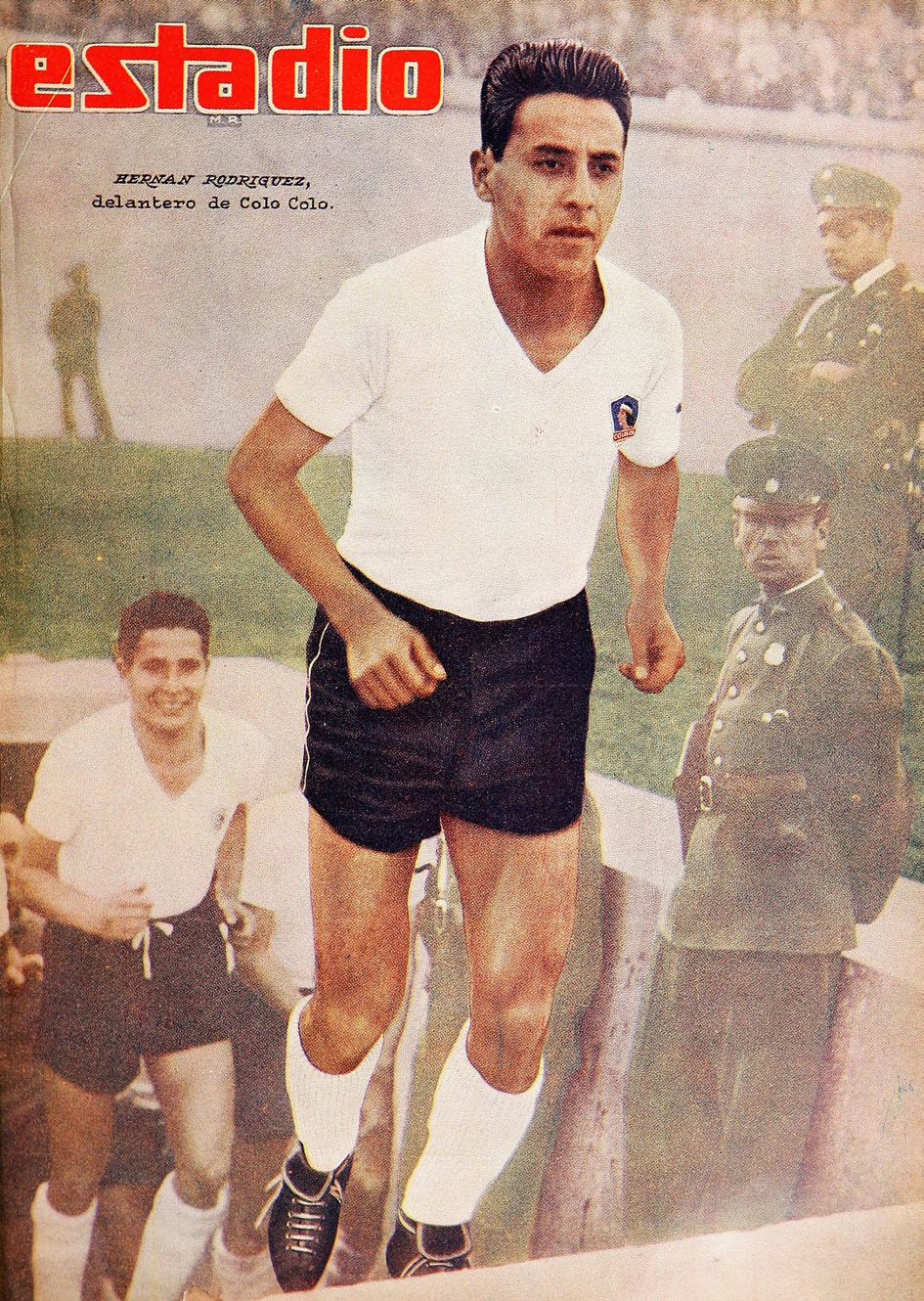
- Rodríguez with Colo-Colo in 1955

Personal information
- Full name: Hernán Rodríguez Aliste
- Date of birth: 2 May 1933
- Place of birth: Santiago, Chile
- Date of death: January 2026 (aged 92)
- Position: Midfielder

Senior career*
| Years | Team | Apps | (Gls) |
| 1953 | Naval | – | (–) |
| 1954–1961 | Colo-Colo | 117 | (14) |
| 1961–1963 | Ferrobádminton | 85 | (5) |
| 1964–1966 | Rangers de Talca | 50 | (3) |
| Total | | 252 | (22) |

International career
| 1955–1961 | Chile | 22 | (0) |
- * Club domestic league appearances and goals

Hernán Rodríguez Aliste (Note: In this Chilean name, the first or paternal surname is Rodríguez and the second or maternal family name is Aliste.) (2 May 1933 – January 2026) was a Chilean footballer who played as a midfielder.

== Biography ==
Rodríguez captained Colo-Colo and made 130 official appearances in total between 1954 and 1961 and scored 16 goals.

He won the Primera División in 1956 and 1960 and the inaugural Copa Chile in 1958.

He made 22 appearances for the Chile national team from 1955 to 1961. He was part of Chile's squad for the 1959 South American Championship that took place in Argentina and also captained the team on a tour of Europe in 1960 but fell out of favour before the 1962 World Cup in Chile.

Rodríguez died in January 2026, at the age of 92.
