= Gallegos del Río =

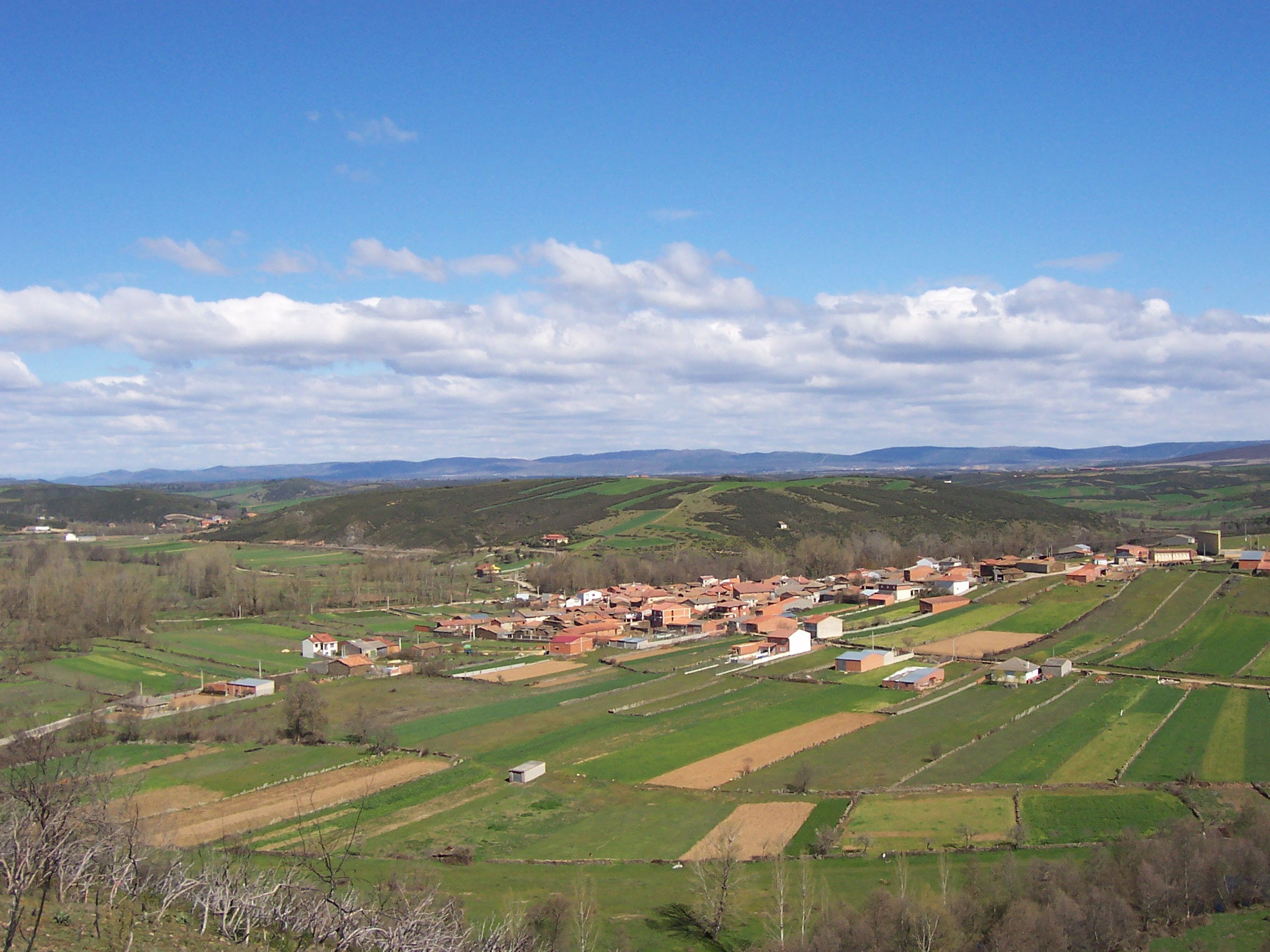

- Location in Spain.
- Coordinates: 41°44′4.59″N 6°10′10.28″W
- Country: Spain
- Autonomous community: Castile and León
- Province: Zamora
- Comarca: Aliste

Government
  - Mayor: Consuelo Gabella Gabella

Area
  - Total: 78 km^{2} (30 sq mi)
- Elevation: 719 m (2,359 ft)

Population (2025-01-01)
  - Total: 455
  - Density: 5.8/km^{2} (15/sq mi)
- Time zone: UTC+1 (CET)
  - Summer (DST): UTC+2 (CEST)

Gallegos del Río is a municipality in the province of Zamora, Castile and León, Spain. According to the 2009 census (INE) it had a population of 663 inhabitants.

== Town hall ==
Gallegos del Río is home to the town hall of 7 villages:

- Domez (160 inhabitants, INE 2020).
- Gallegos del Río (82 inhabitants, INE 2020).
- Valer (78 inhabitants, INE 2020).
- Puercas (56 inhabitants, INE 2020).
- Flores (44 inhabitants, INE 2020).
- Lober (34 inhabitants, INE 2020).
- Tolilla (12 inhabitants, INE 2020).
