= Ourense Torcs =

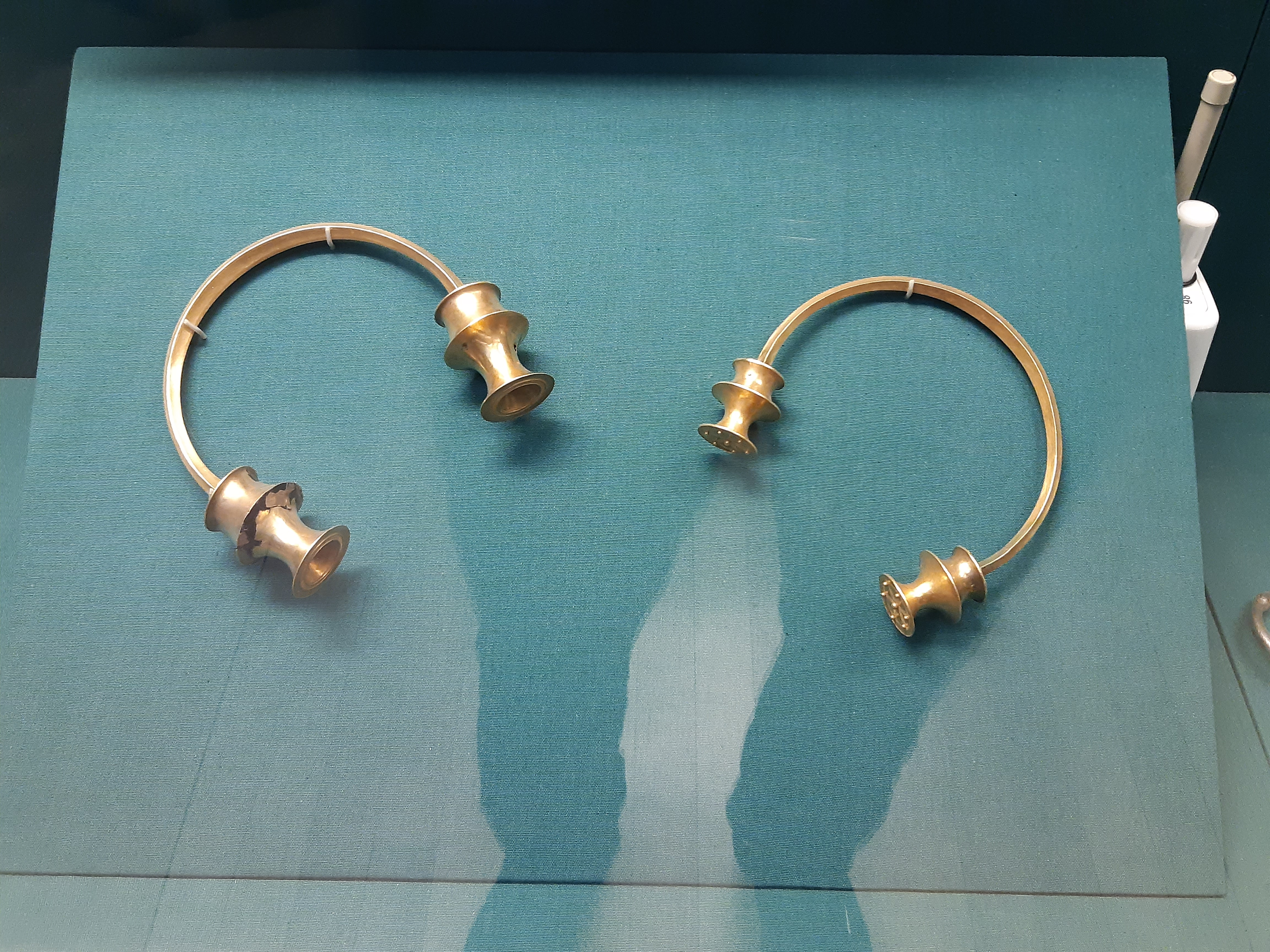
- The Orense Torcs on display at the British Museum
- Material: Gold
- Size: 13.7cm diameter
- Created: c. 300-150 BC
- Present location: British Museum, London
- Registration: 1960,0503.1-2

The Ourense Torcs are a pair of Iron Age gold torc neck rings found near Ourense in Northwest Spain in the 1950s. They were acquired by the British Museum in 1960.

== Discovery ==
The exact find spot of the two neck rings has never been confirmed but experts have determined, based on the shape and design of the torcs, that they originate from Ourense in the province of Galicia near the Spanish/Portuguese border.

== Description ==
The two gold torcs are nearly identical with double reel-shaped terminals and circular body. The terminals have a large tapered central depression, with embossed ornamentation around the edge. Their Celtic design is characteristic of the torcs produced in Galicia and northern Portugal, in the Iberian Peninsula.

== See also ==
- Castro Culture
- Braganza Brooch
- Cordoba Treasure

== Gallery of Galician torcs ==
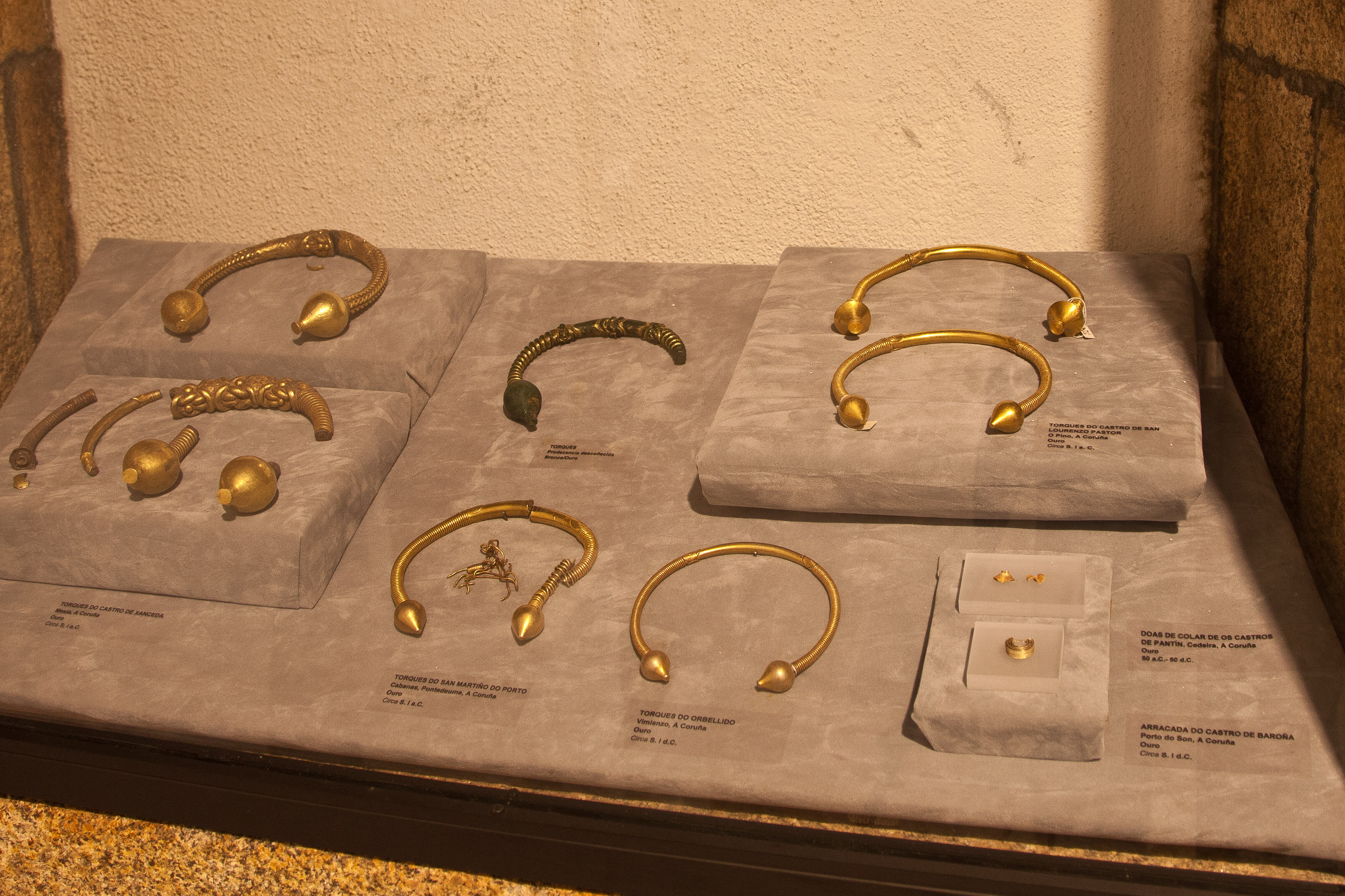
Northern Galician torcs

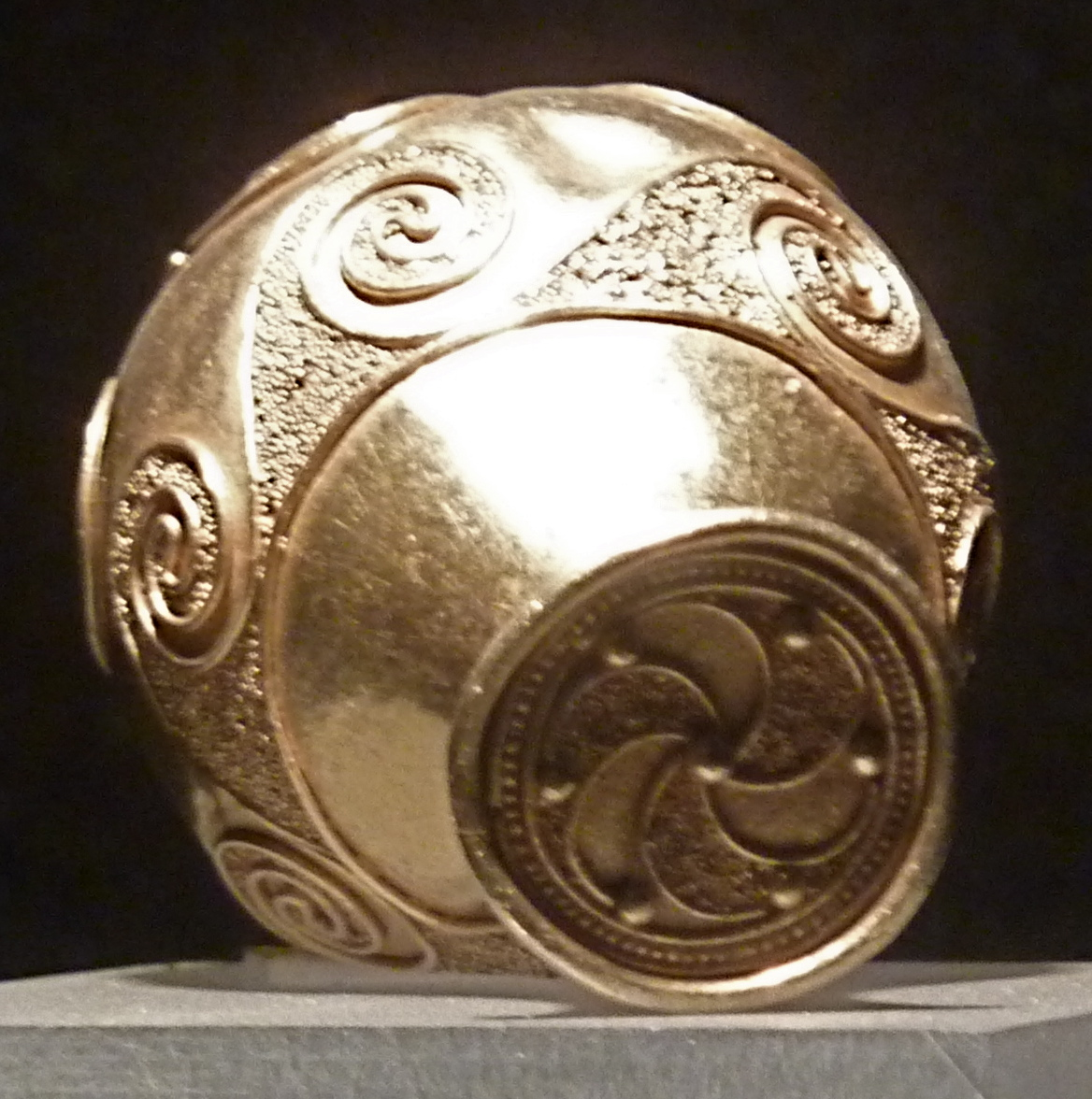
Torc terminal from A Guarda, Galicia. Museo do Castro de St. Tegra

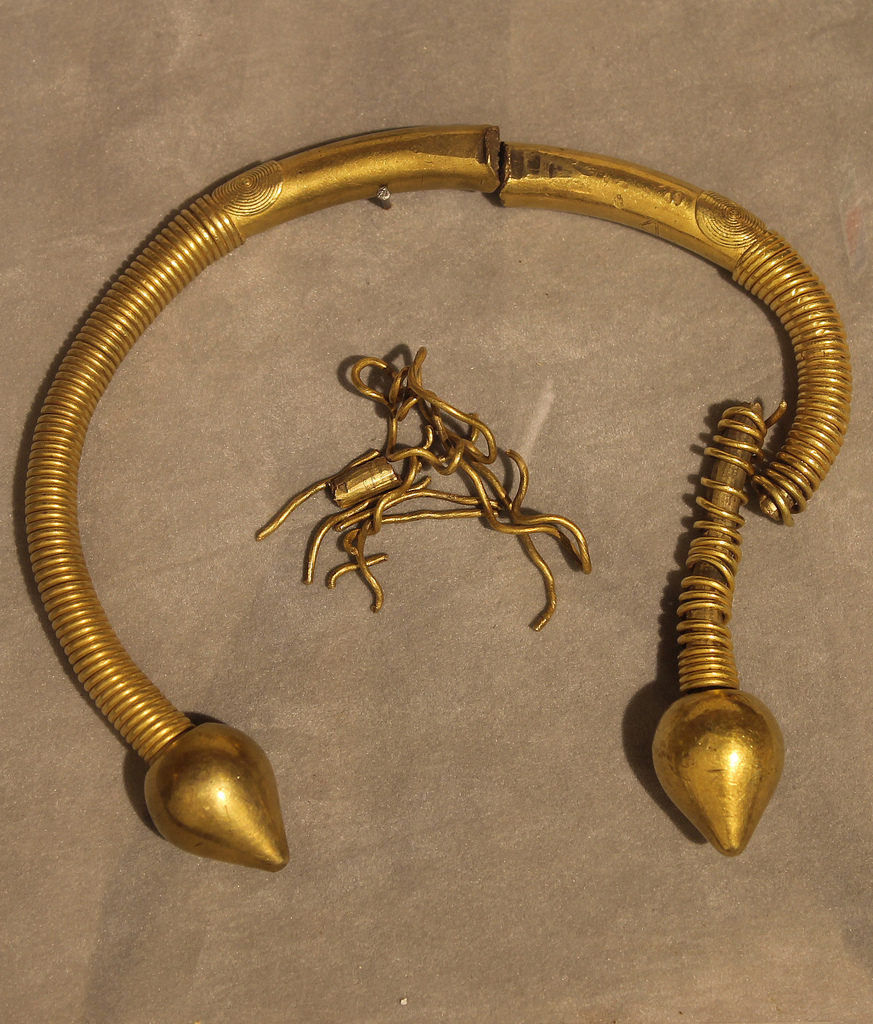
Northern Gallaeci torc (Artabri type with "pear" terminals), showing construction, and decoration of the hoop

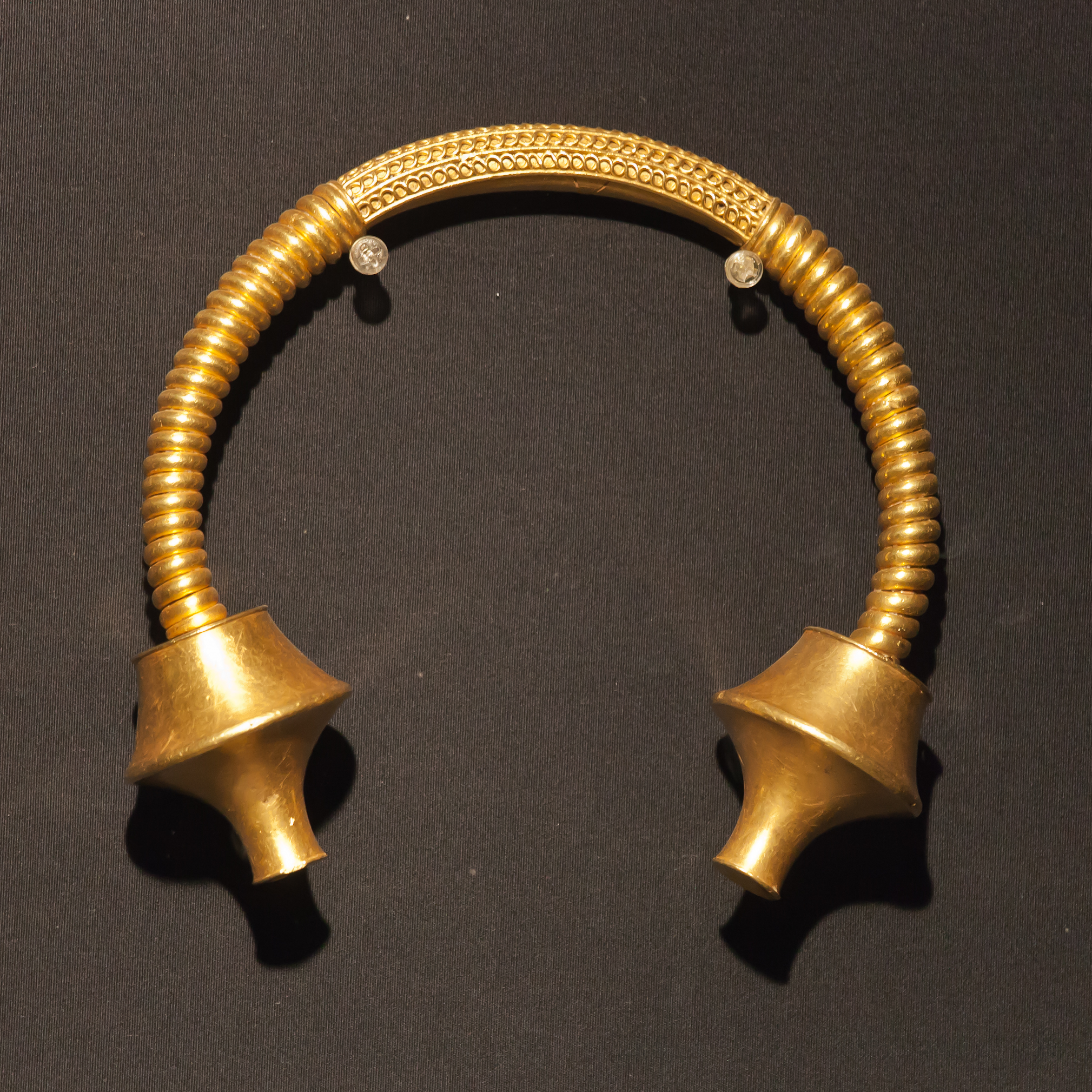
Torc from Burela, Galicia, with double moulding scotiae terminals, and hoop decoration. At 1.812 kilos, the heaviest Iberian torc.

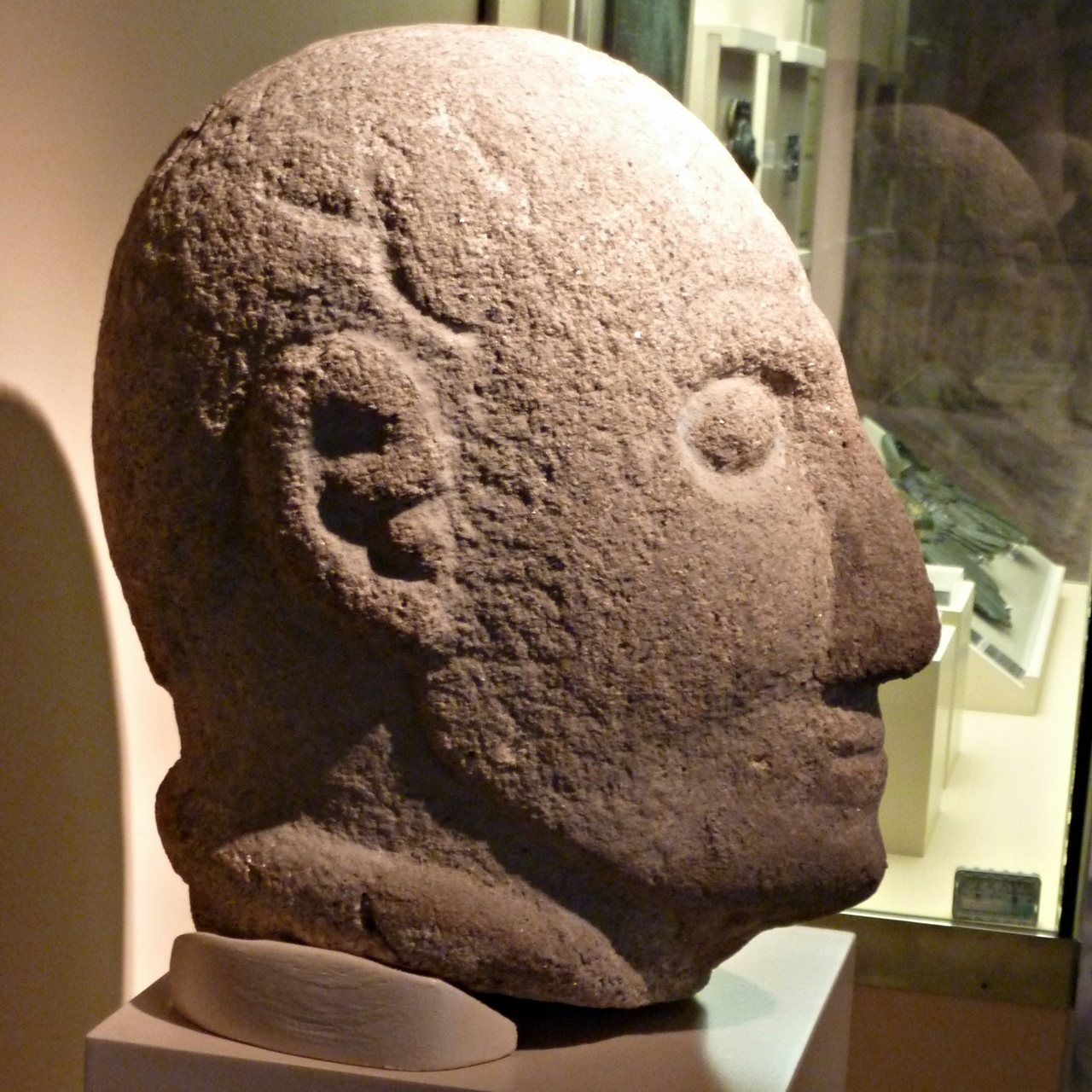
A Gallaecian warrior's head, wearing helmet and a torc. Museo Provincial de Ourense

== Bibliography ==
- M. Lenerz-de Wilde, 'The Celts in Spain' in The Celtic World, London and New York, Routledge, 1995
- I. Stead, Celtic Art, British Museum Press, 1996
- Megaw Ruth and Vincent, Celtic Art: From Its Beginnings to the Book of Kells, 2001
