= Braganza Brooch =

3rd-century BC Greek-Iberian gold fibula

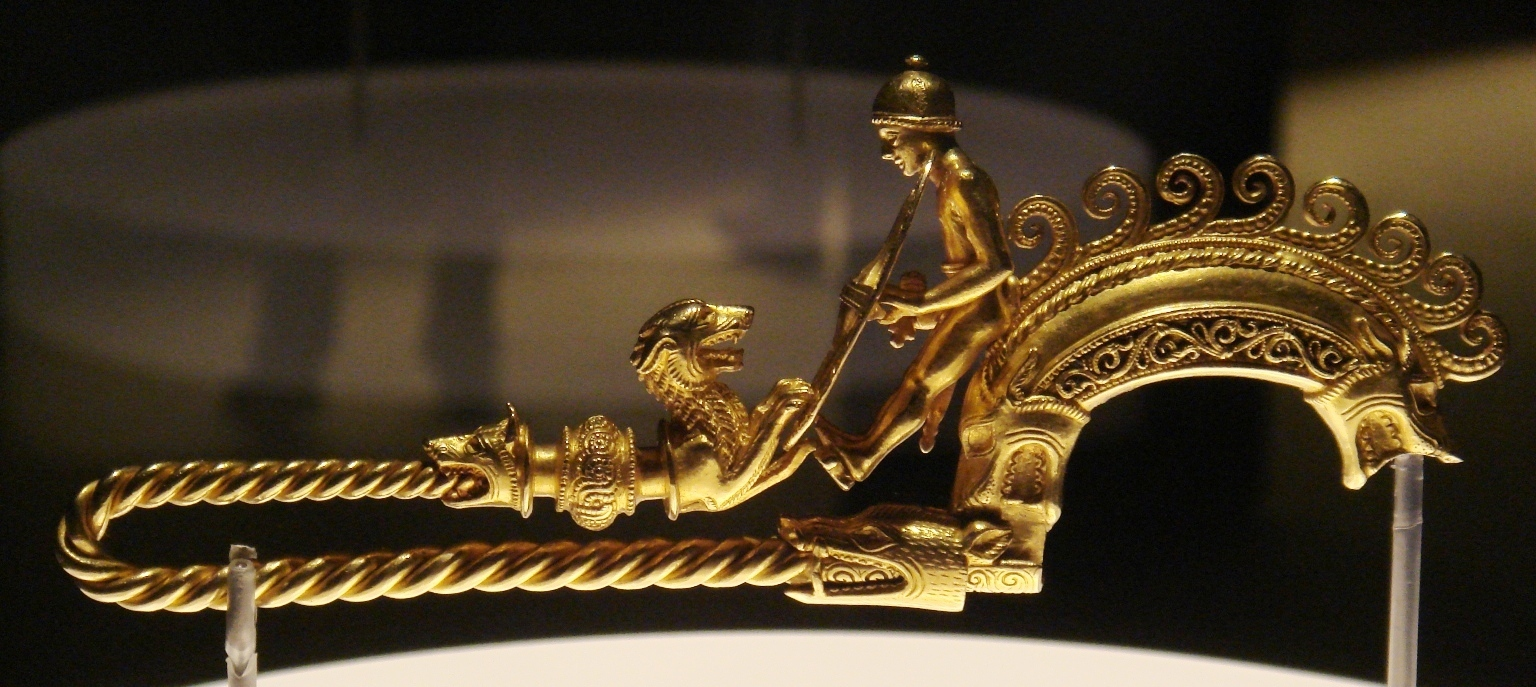
- Braganza Brooch
- Material: Gold
- Size: 14 cm long
- Created: 3rd Century BC
- Present location: British Museum, London
- Registration: 2001,0501.1

The Braganza Brooch is a gold ornamental fibula that was made in the third century BC by a Greek craftsman for a Celtic Iberian client. Since its discovery in unknown circumstances in the nineteenth century in Portugal, it has belonged to a variety of owners, including various members of the House of Braganza, for which it is named, before being purchased by the British Museum in 2001.

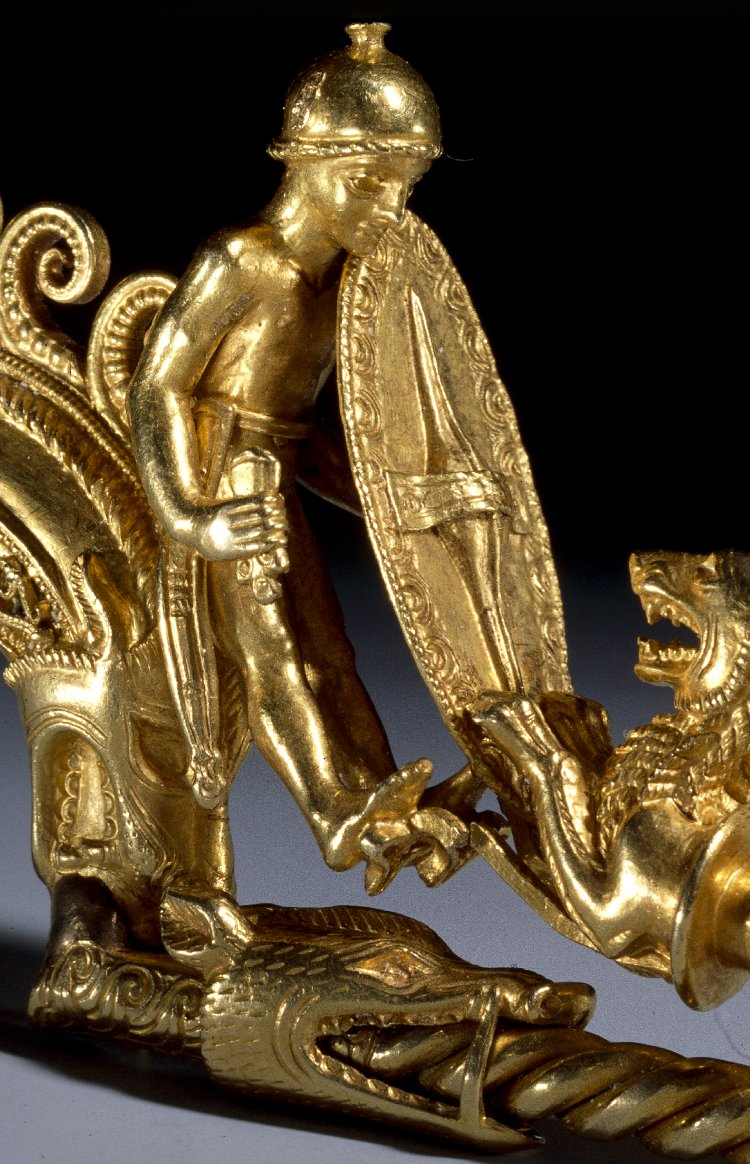
Celtic Warrior on the brooch

== Description ==
This heavy gold brooch is dominated by the figure of a naked warrior who wears a Celtic helmet and protects himself with a Celtic shield and sword from a hunting dog which jumps up to him. Each end of the fibula is decorated by a dog's head and it once furnished a spring and pin which is now lost. The form, style and technique suggest that it was made in the third century BC by a Greek jeweller for a Celtic patron who lived on the Iberian Peninsula. Contemporary Iberian brooches were usually made of silver and were often decorated with warriors on horseback accompanied by hunting dogs. In this unique gold version, the craftsman has simplified the hunting scene and added a boar's head, which once served as the sliding catch for the now missing pin. The brooch measures approximately 14 cm long.

== Ownership ==
The brooch was once in the collection of the Royal House of Braganza and was perhaps collected by Fernando II, consort of Queen Maria of Portugal. Most of the jewellery of the Braganza dynasty was inherited in 1919 by HRH Nevada of Portugal, Princess d'Braganza and Duchesse of Porto who later emigrated to America. On her death in 1941, the collection was sold to Warren Piper of Chicago. The brooch was in turn purchased by Thomas F. Flannery Jr. in 1950. After being loaned to the British Museum for 7 years, it was purchased by the museum in 2001.

== See also ==
- Cordoba Treasure
- Orense Torcs
