= Salto de Castro =

- Town and Abandoned village
- Poblado del Salto de Castro
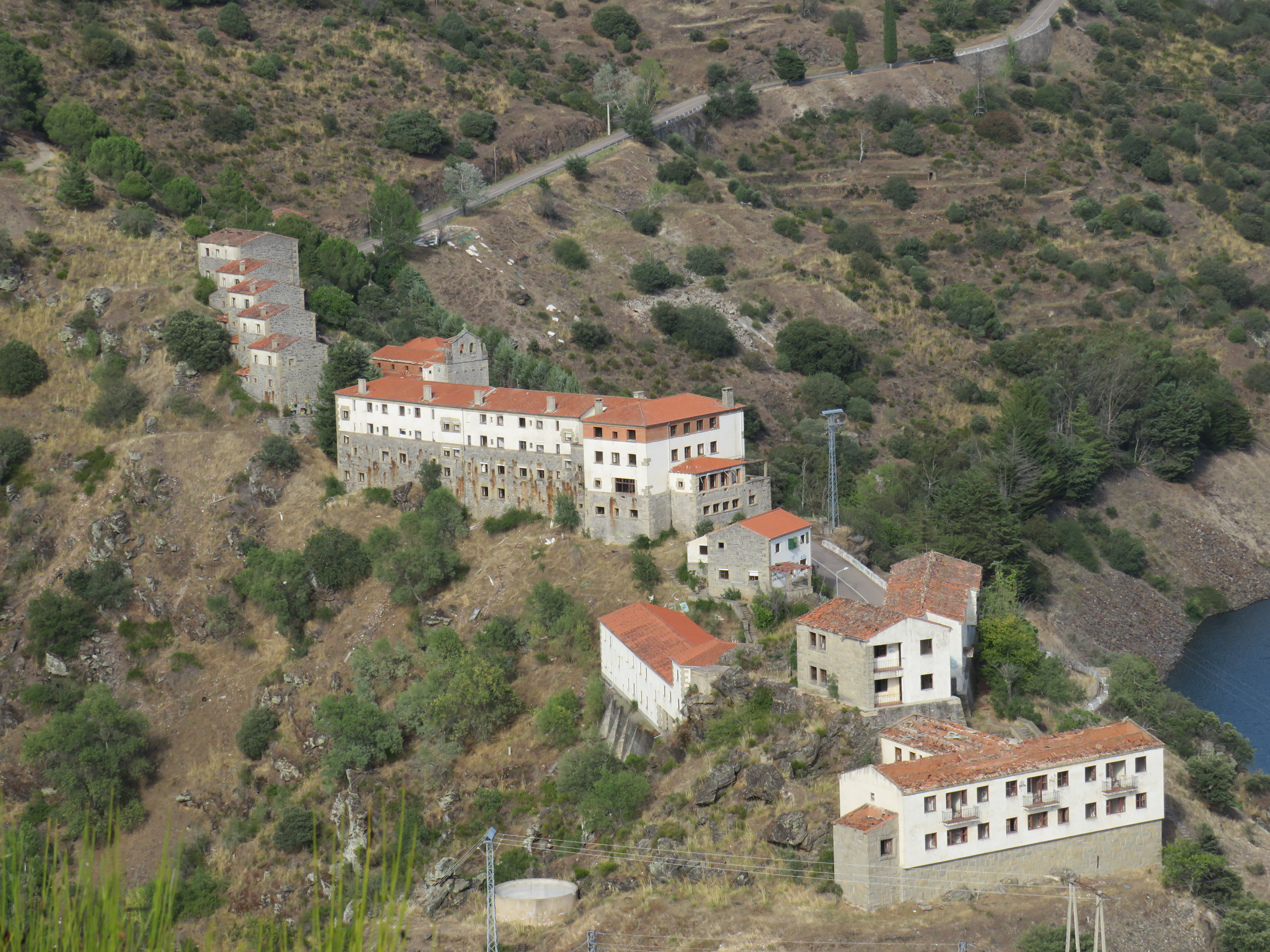
- Aerial view of the town

- Location of Salto de Castro in Spain
- Coordinates: 41°34′37″N 06°11′12″W
- Country: Spain
- Autonomous community: Castile and León
- Province: Zamora
- Comarca: Aliste
- Municipality: Fonfría
- Mancomunidad: Tierras de Aliste
- Elevation: 601 m (1,972 ft)

Population (2016)
  - Total: 0
- Demonym(s): Castreño, -a
- Postal code: 49511

Salto de Castro, or Poblado del Salto de Castro, is an abandoned village in the municipality of Fonfría, Zamora, Spain. It is located near the Castro Dam, in the lowest part of the Arribes of Douro. After seeing its last family move out in 1989 and being abandoned ever since, it was finally purchased in 2025 by businessman/musician Jason Lee Beckwith from the United States.
