= Fonfría, Zamora =

Coordinates: 41°38′09″N 6°08′24″W

Fonfría
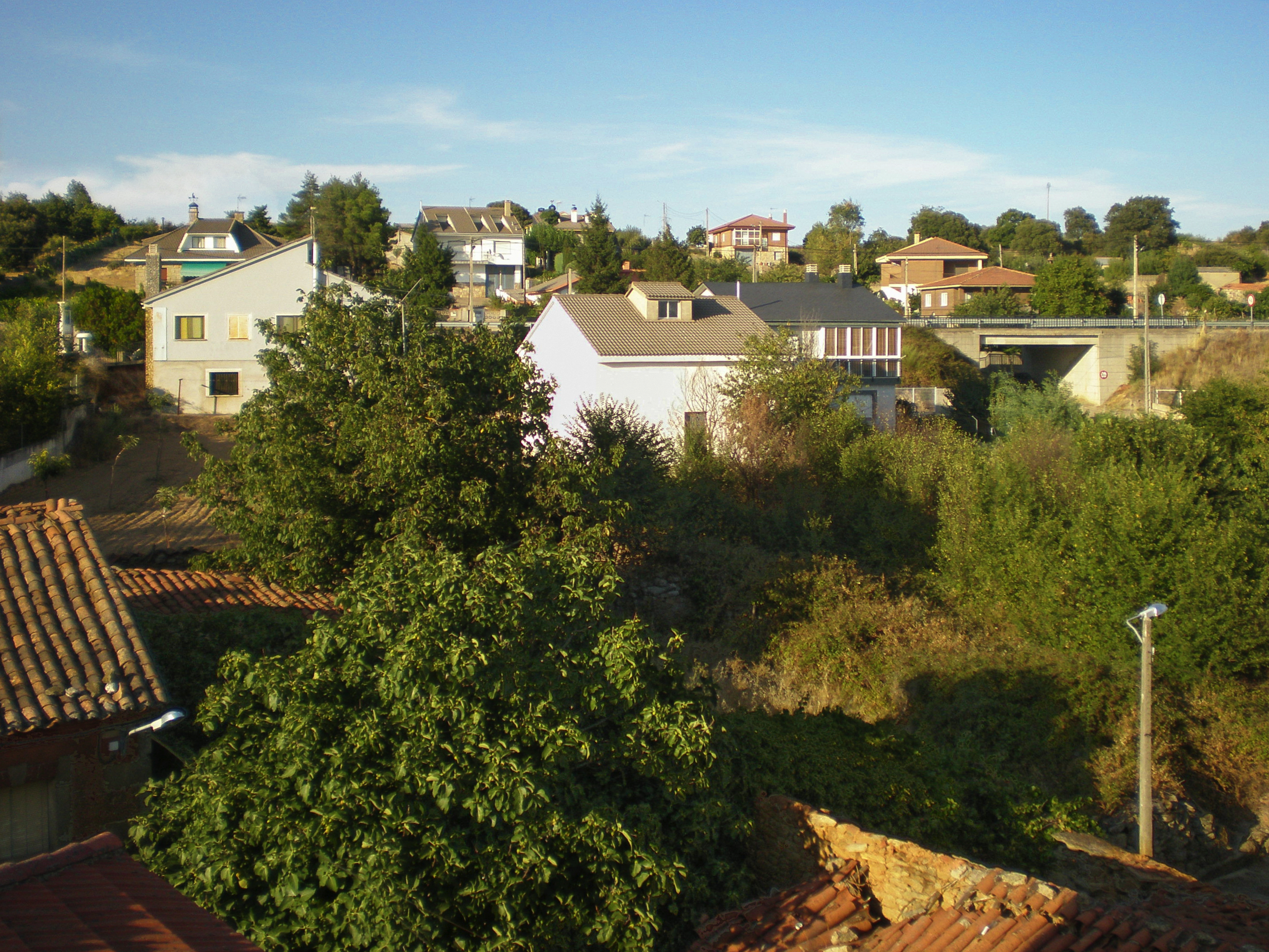

- Coat of arms
- Interactive map of Fonfría
- Country: Spain
- Autonomous community: Castile and León
- Province: Zamora
- Municipality: Fonfría

Area
  - Total: 13,223 km^{2} (5,105 sq mi)

Population (2025-01-01)
  - Total: 794
  - Density: 0.0600/km^{2} (0.156/sq mi)
- Time zone: UTC+1 (CET)
  - Summer (DST): UTC+2 (CEST)

Fonfría is a Spanish municipality in the province of Zamora, Castile and León. It has a population of 1,070 and an area of 132.37 km².

== Town hall ==
Fonfría is home to the town hall of 9 villages:

- Fonfría (171 inhabitants, INE 2020).
- Bermillo de Alba (118 inhabitants, INE 2020).
- Fornillos de Aliste (115 inhabitants, INE 2020).
- Ceadea (87 inhabitants, INE 2020).
- Moveros (85 inhabitants, INE 2020).
- Castro de Alcañices (70 inhabitants, INE 2020).
- Brandilanes (58 inhabitants, INE 2020).
- Arcillera (46 inhabitants, INE 2020).
- Salto de Castro (0 inhabitants, INE 2020).
