= San Vitero =

Coordinates: 41°47′N 6°21′W

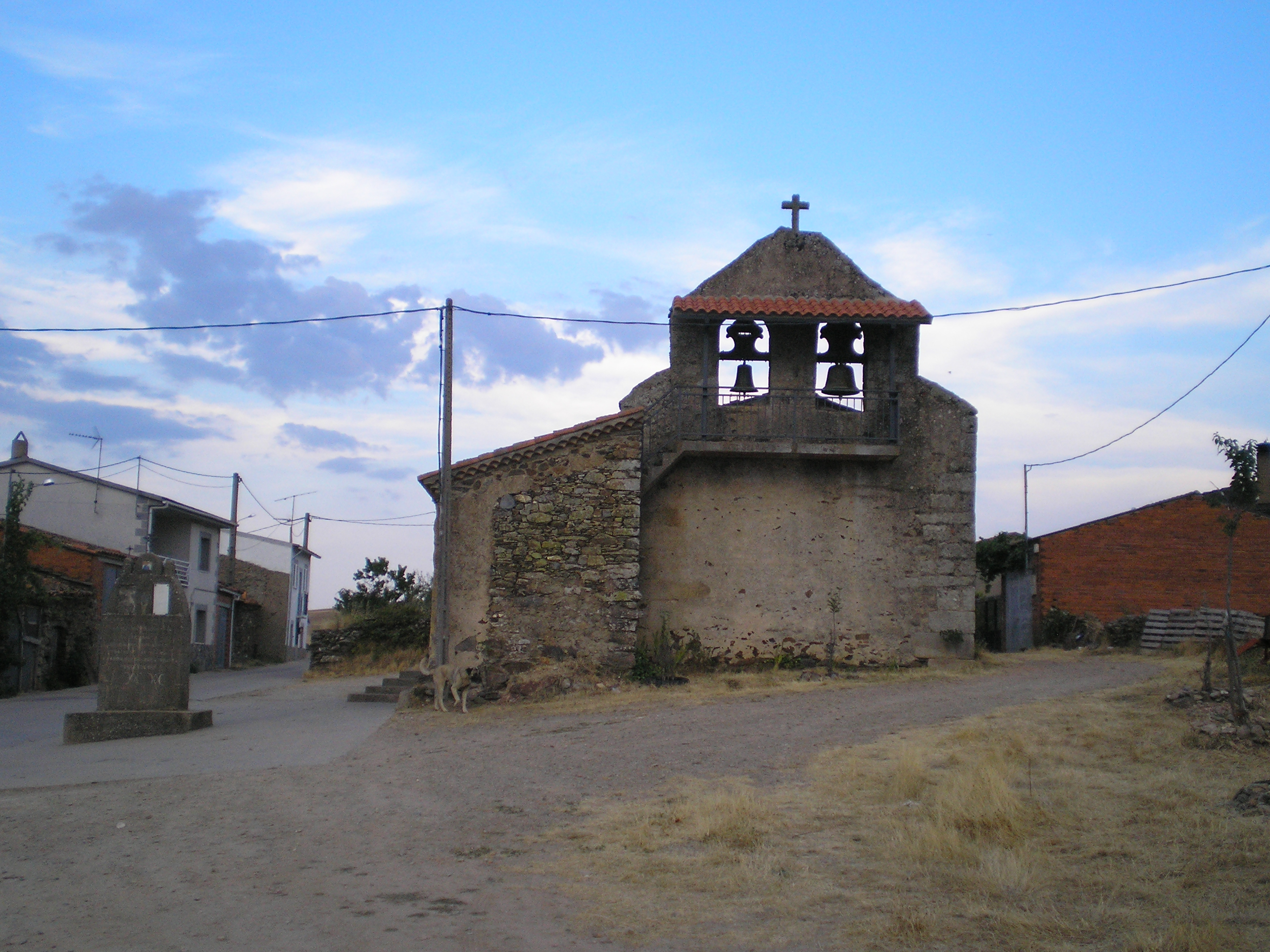

- Coat of arms
- Interactive map of San Vitero
- Country: Spain
- Autonomous community: Castile and León
- Province: Zamora
- Municipality: San Vitero

Area
  - Total: 64 km^{2} (25 sq mi)

Population (2025-01-01)
  - Total: 419
  - Density: 6.5/km^{2} (17/sq mi)
- Time zone: UTC+1 (CET)
  - Summer (DST): UTC+2 (CEST)

San Vitero is a municipality located in the province of Zamora, Castile and León, Spain. According to the 2004 census (INE), the municipality has a population of 677 inhabitants.

== Town hall ==
San Vitero is home to the town hall of 5 villages:

- San Vitero (241 inhabitants, INE 2020).
- San Juan del Rebollar (157 inhabitants, INE 2020).
- El Poyo (57 inhabitants, INE 2020).
- San Cristóbal de Aliste (30 inhabitants, INE 2020).
- Villarino de Cebal (7 inhabitants, INE 2020).
