= Gaita sanabresa =

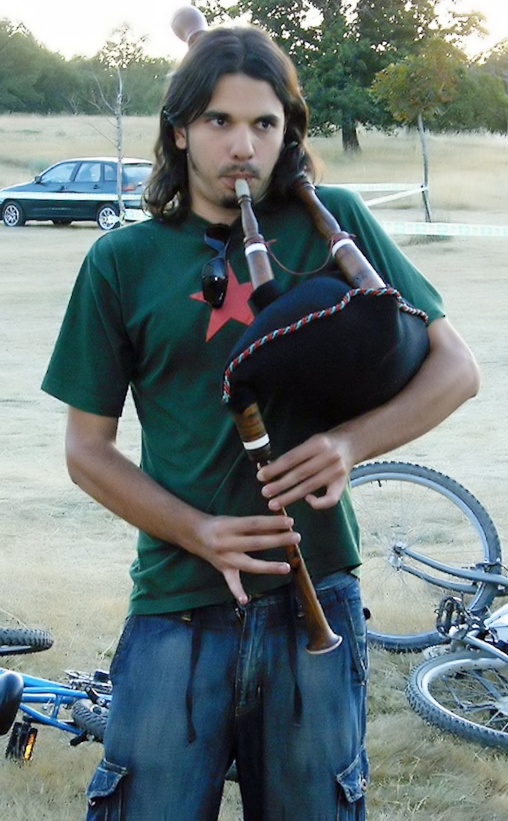
A gaita sanabresa

The gaita sanabresa is a type of bagpipe native to Sanabria, a comarca of the province of Zamora in northwestern Spain.

The gaita sanabresa features a single drone. The scale of this chanter is distinct from others in Spain, in A mode (Eolic) much different from the gaita alistana of Aliste in D Mode (Doric) as well as the "Gaita Mirandesa" from Portugal. In playing, the fingering is generally open, though some players use semi-closed touches.

The instrument was in decline in the 20th century and nearly extinct by the 1980s, but subsequent revivals, aided in part by the Escuela de Folclore de Puebla de Sanabria has led to a new local popularity for the instrument.

== Sources ==
- Gaita Sanabresa.com

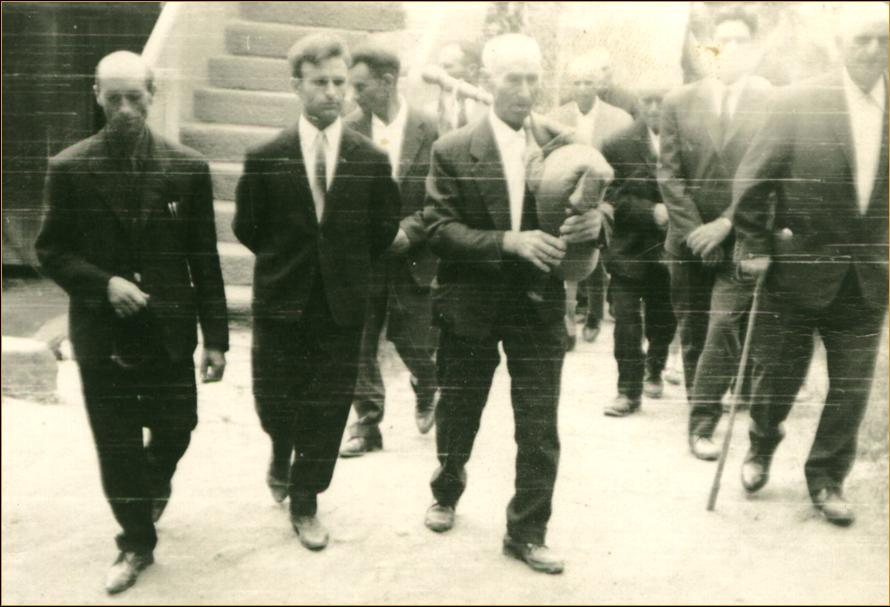
Cerefino Espada playing the gaita sanabresa in 1955
