= Cordoba Treasure =

Iron Age silver hoard found in Cordoba, Spain

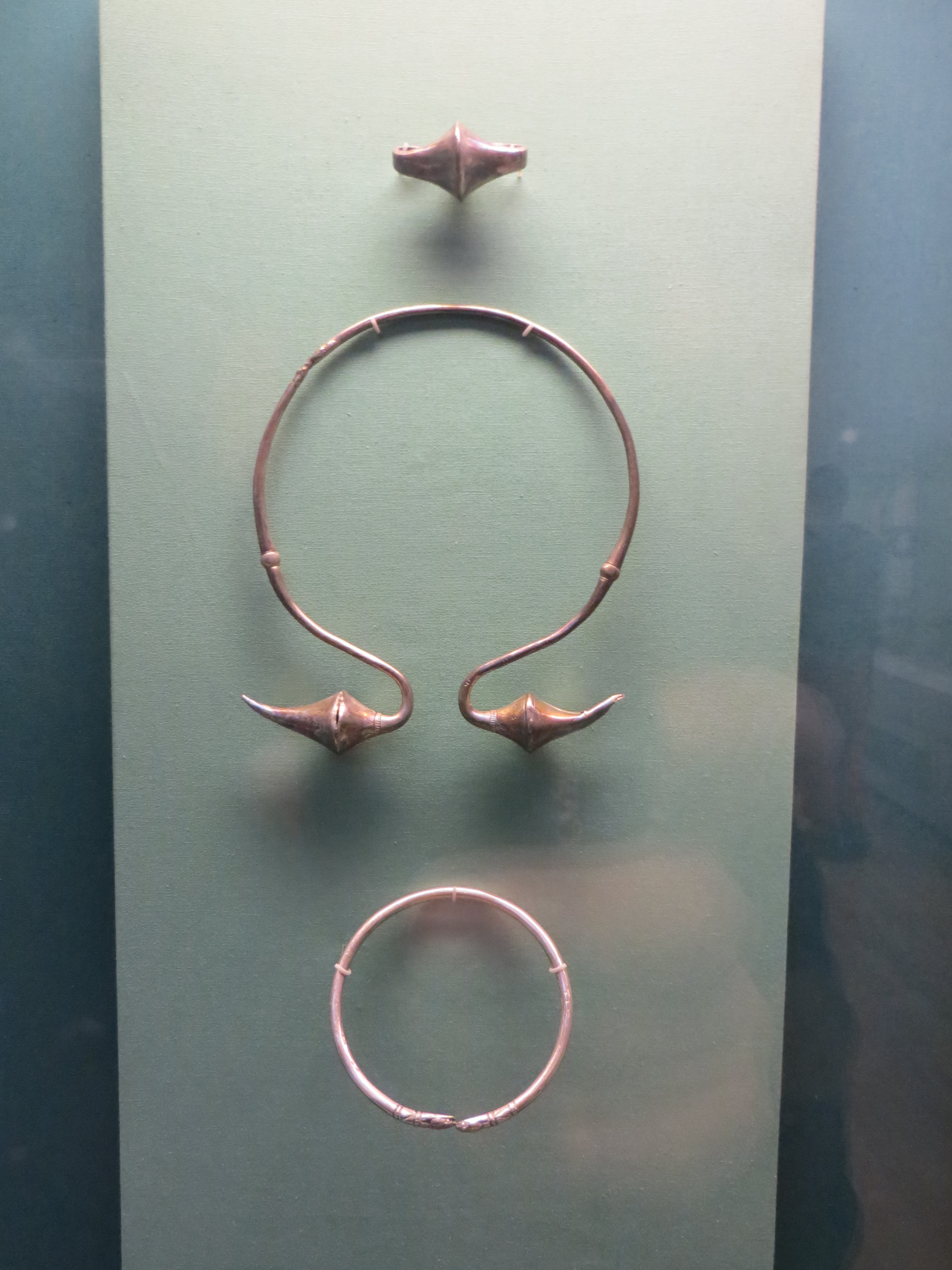
- Silver torc from the Cordoba Treasure as displayed in the British Museum
- Material: Silver
- Size: 16 cm diameter
- Created: 100 BC
- Present location: British Museum, London
- Registration: P&EE 1932,0706.2

The Cordoba Treasure, or Tesoro de Córdoba in Spanish, is the name of a major Iron Age silver hoard found on the outskirts of the city of Córdoba, Spain in 1915. The entire treasure was purchased by the British Museum in 1932, where it has been on public display ever since.

== Discovery ==
The hoard of silver objects was found by chance in 1915 at Molino de Marrubial, a suburb of the city of Córdoba in the region of Andalucia, Spain. The treasure had been buried in a pit for safe-keeping, but was never retrieved by its original owners. The Cordoba Treasure eventually came into the possession of the American art collector Walter Leo Hildburgh, who sold it to the British Museum in 1932. The treasure is one of the few Iron Age hoards from the Iberian Peninsula to be in the collection of a museum outside Spain or Portugal.

== Description ==
The hoard dates from the Iron Age and was probably buried around 100 BC. Even though this part of Spain had recently been conquered to become part of the Roman Empire, the style of jewellery reflects Celtic aesthetic traditions. The silver treasure includes a large circular torc with terminals in the form of double cones, eight armlets with zoomorphic relief decoration, a brooch in the shape of two horses' heads, a conical bowl, over three hundred coins, two lumps of silver and other miscellaneous objects including rods and ingots. The coins enable archaeologists to date the treasure, as 82 of them were locally made and 222 were minted in a Roman city.

== Reason for burial ==
It remains unclear why the hoard was never recovered by the person or people by whom it was buried. The large amount of silver in the treasure could have meant that its owner planned to melt it down at one stage, but for some reason was unable to. Others have suggested it could have been a votive offering, following native practices.

== See also ==
- Arcillera Hoard
- Orense Torcs
- Braganza Brooch
- Snettisham Hoard

== Gallery ==
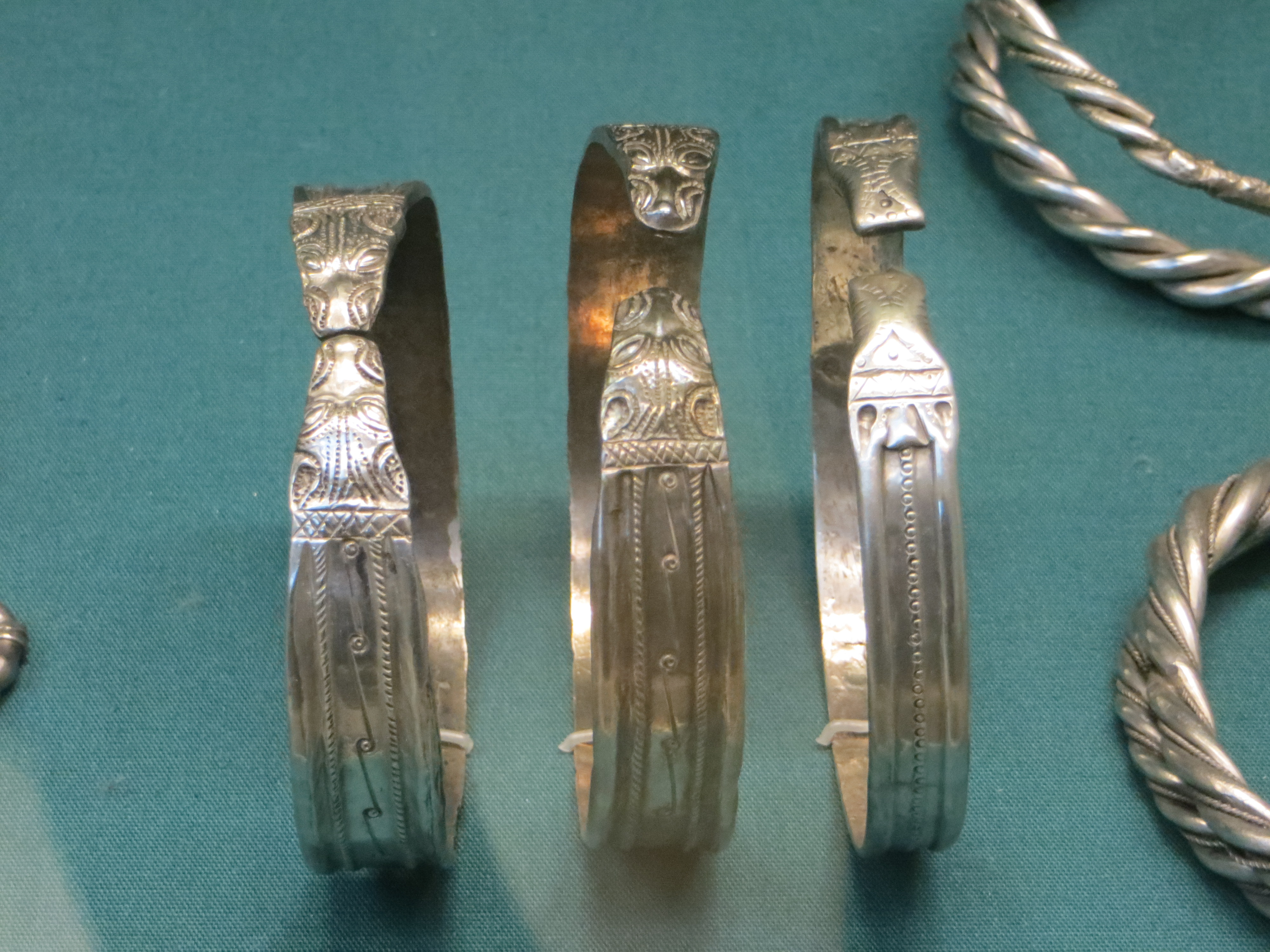
Silver armlets from the treasure

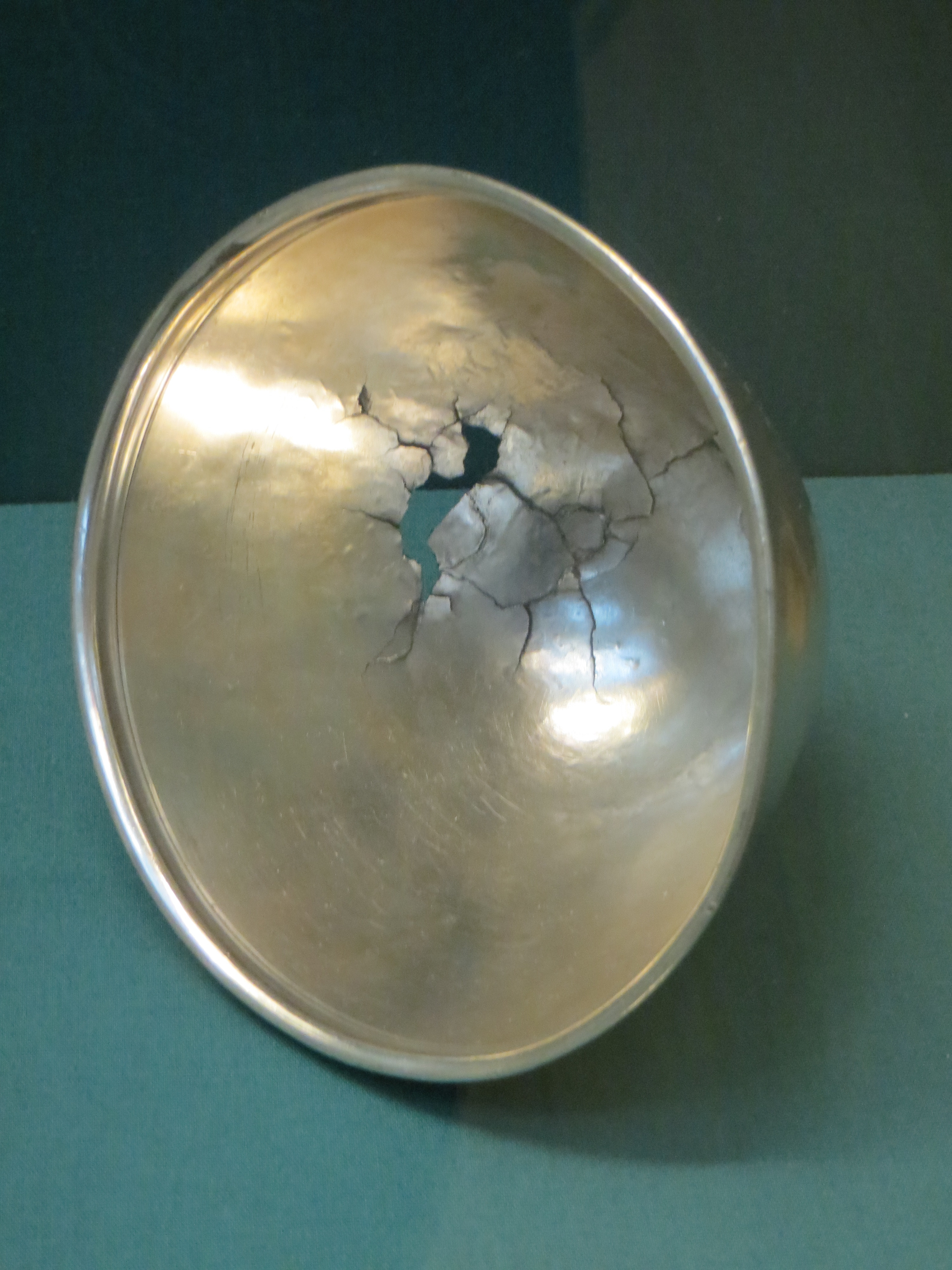
Silver bowl in which the coins were found

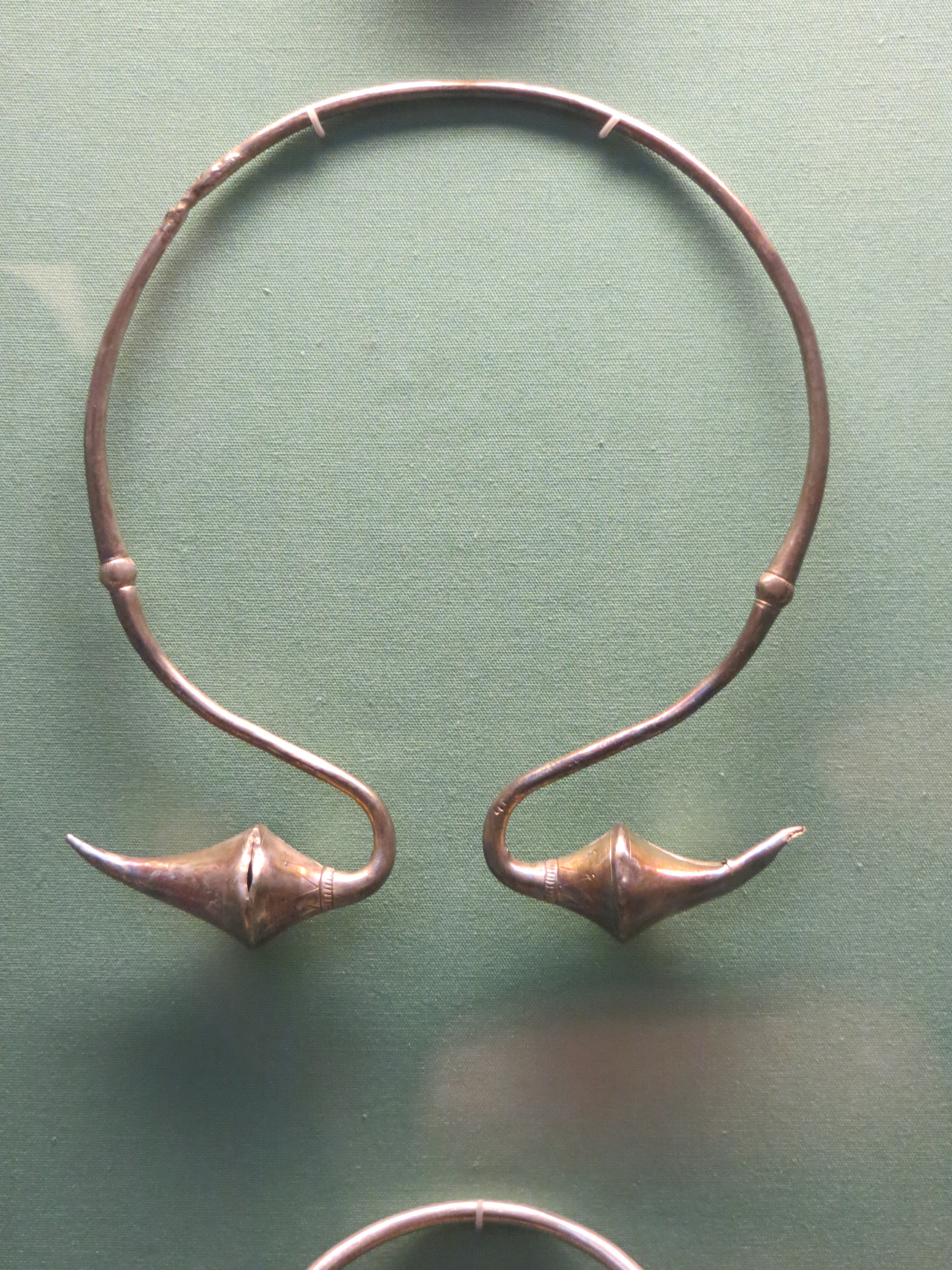
Silver torc, typical of Celtic art from Iberia at this time

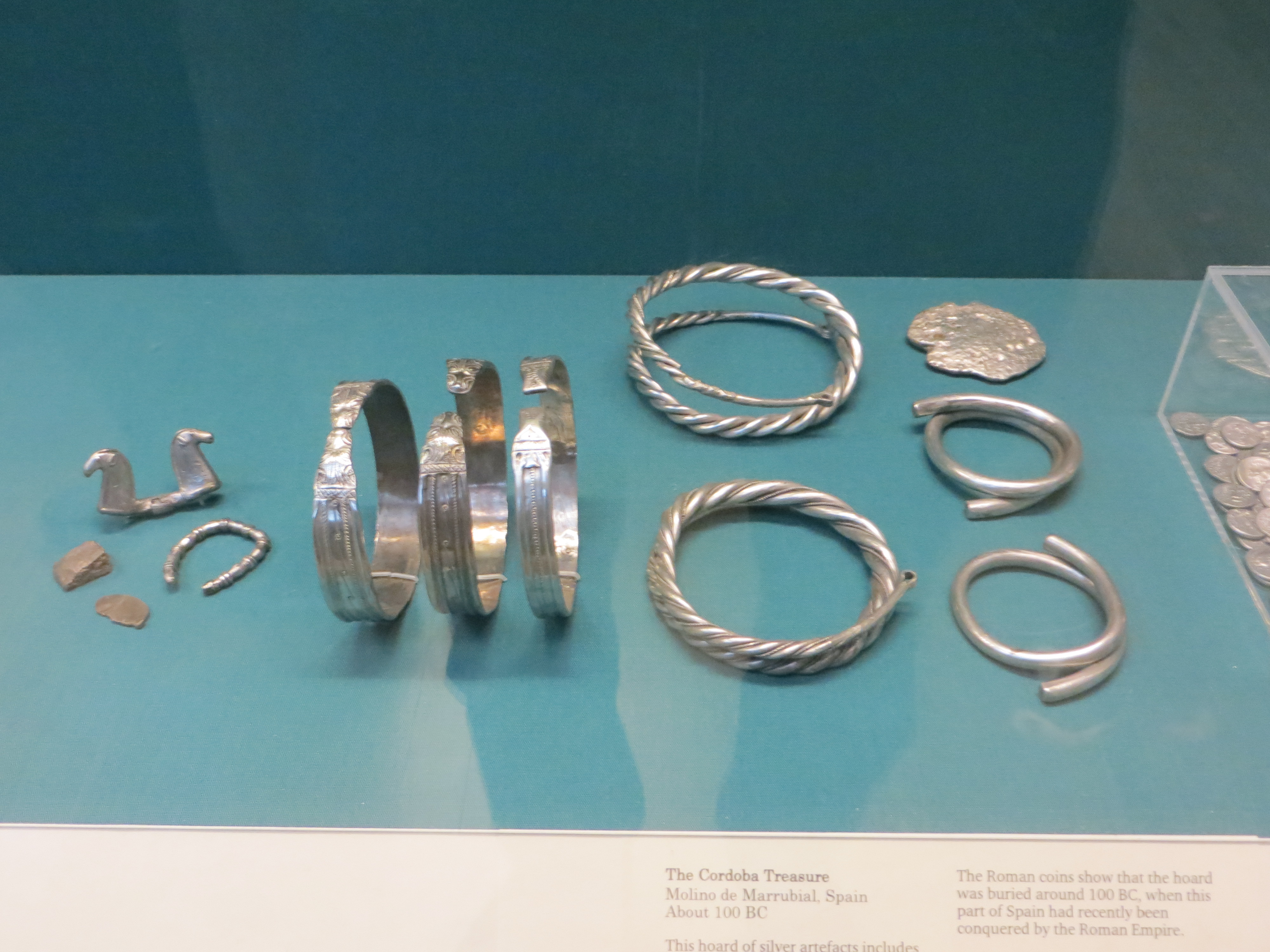
Silver armlets, a brooch and other items from the treasure

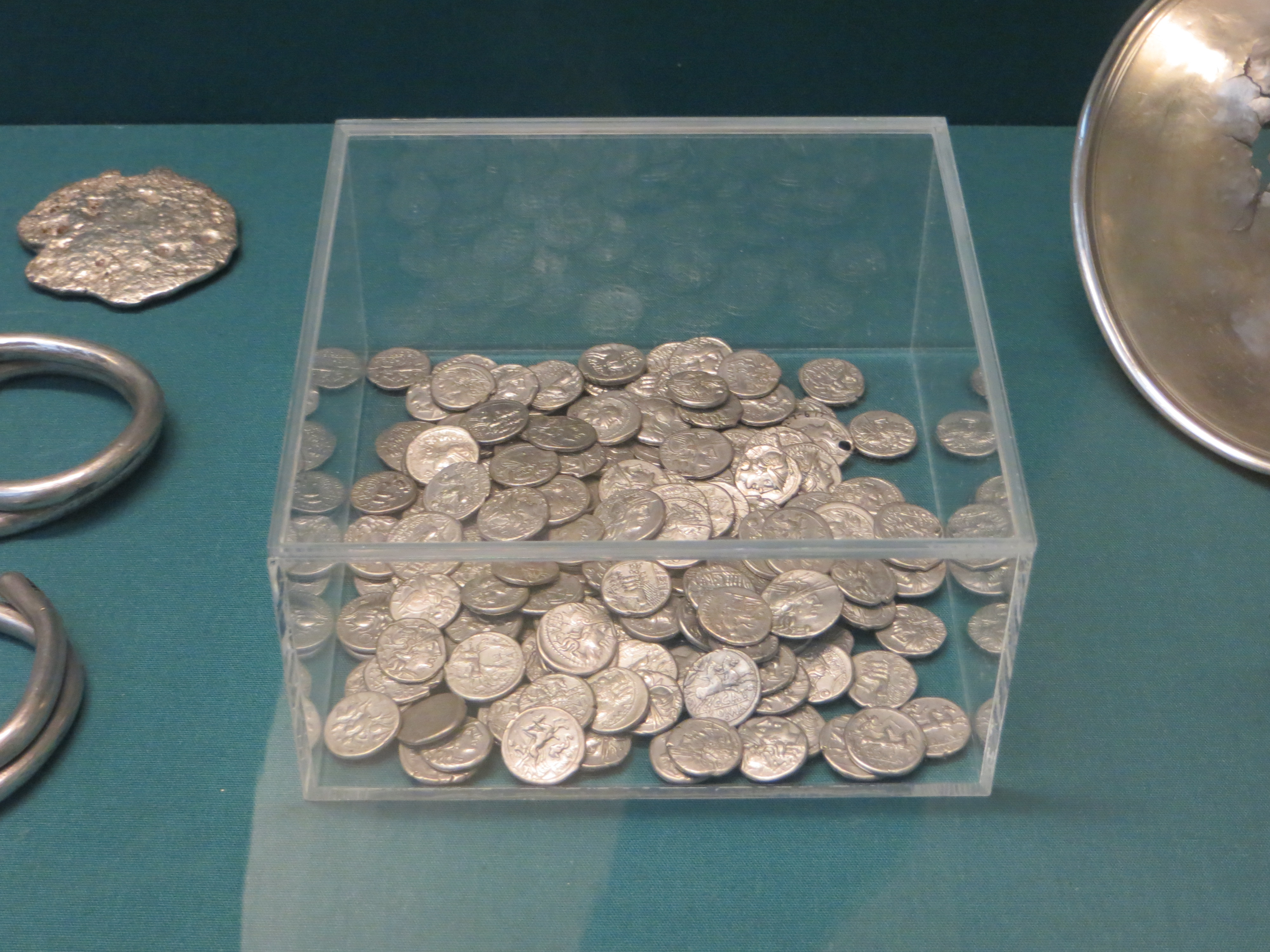
Celtic and Roman coins from the treasure

== Bibliography ==
- Megaw Ruth and Vincent, Celtic Art: From Its Beginnings to the Book of Kells, 2001
- M. Lenerz-de Wilde, 'The Celts in Spain' in The Celtic World (London and New York, Routledge, 1995)
- I. Stead, Celtic Art, British Museum Press, 1996
