= San Vicente de la Cabeza =

Coordinates: 41°48′N 6°15′W

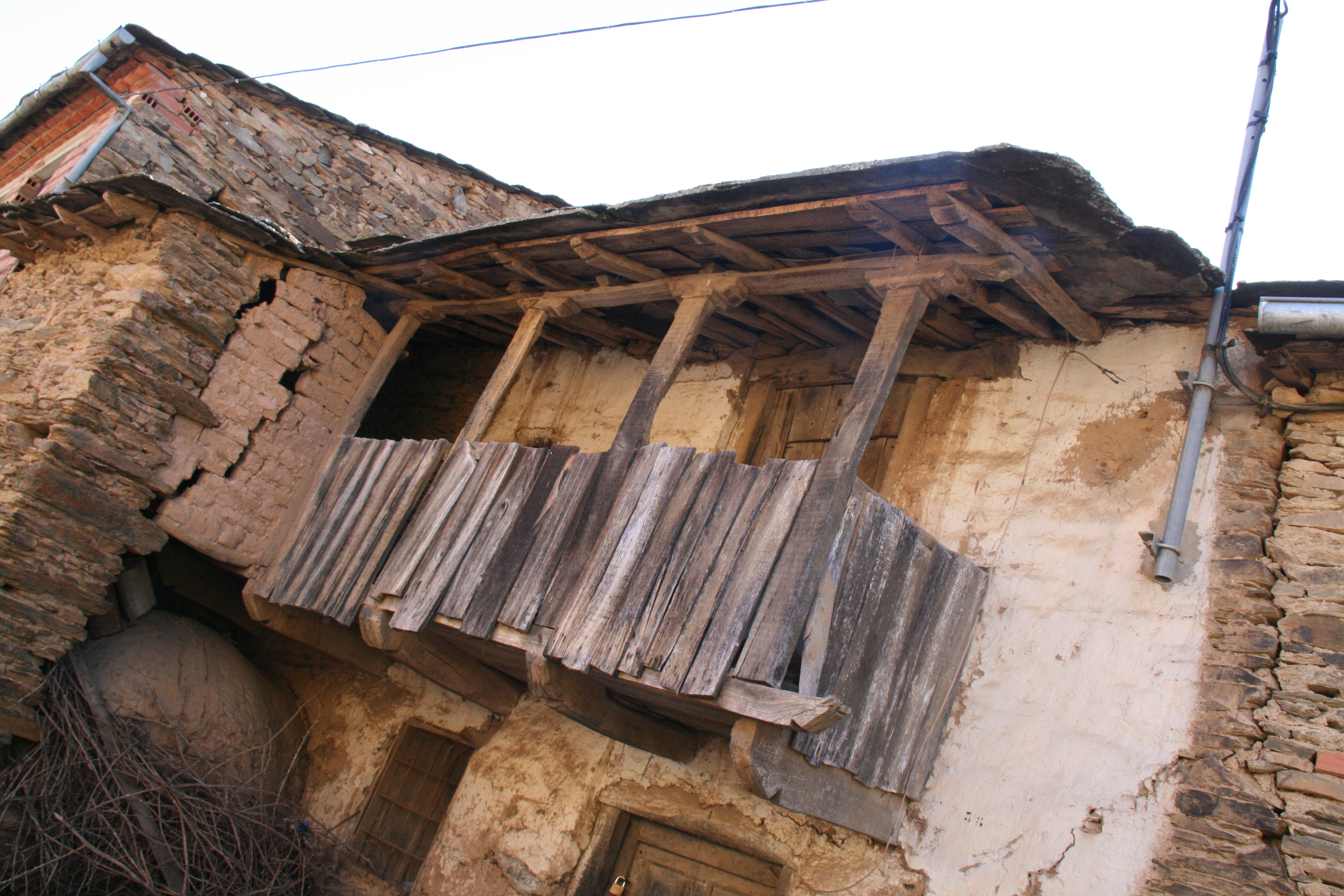

- Coat of arms
- Interactive map of San Vicente de la Cabeza
- Country: Spain
- Autonomous community: Castile and León
- Province: Zamora
- Municipality: San Vicente de la Cabeza

Area
  - Total: 53 km^{2} (20 sq mi)

Population (2025-01-01)
  - Total: 309
  - Density: 5.8/km^{2} (15/sq mi)
- Time zone: UTC+1 (CET)
  - Summer (DST): UTC+2 (CEST)

San Vicente de la Cabeza is a municipality located in the province of Zamora, Castile and León, Spain. In 2023, it had 80 inhabitants.

== Town hall ==
San Vicente de la Cabeza is home to the town hall of 4 villages:

- Bercianos de Aliste (125 inhabitants, INE 2020).
- San Vicente de la Cabeza (106 inhabitants, INE 2020).
- Palazuelo de las Cuevas (104 inhabitants, INE 2020).
- Campogrande de Aliste (22 inhabitants, INE 2020).
