= Trabazos =

Coordinates: 41.7469°N 6.49°W

- Municipality
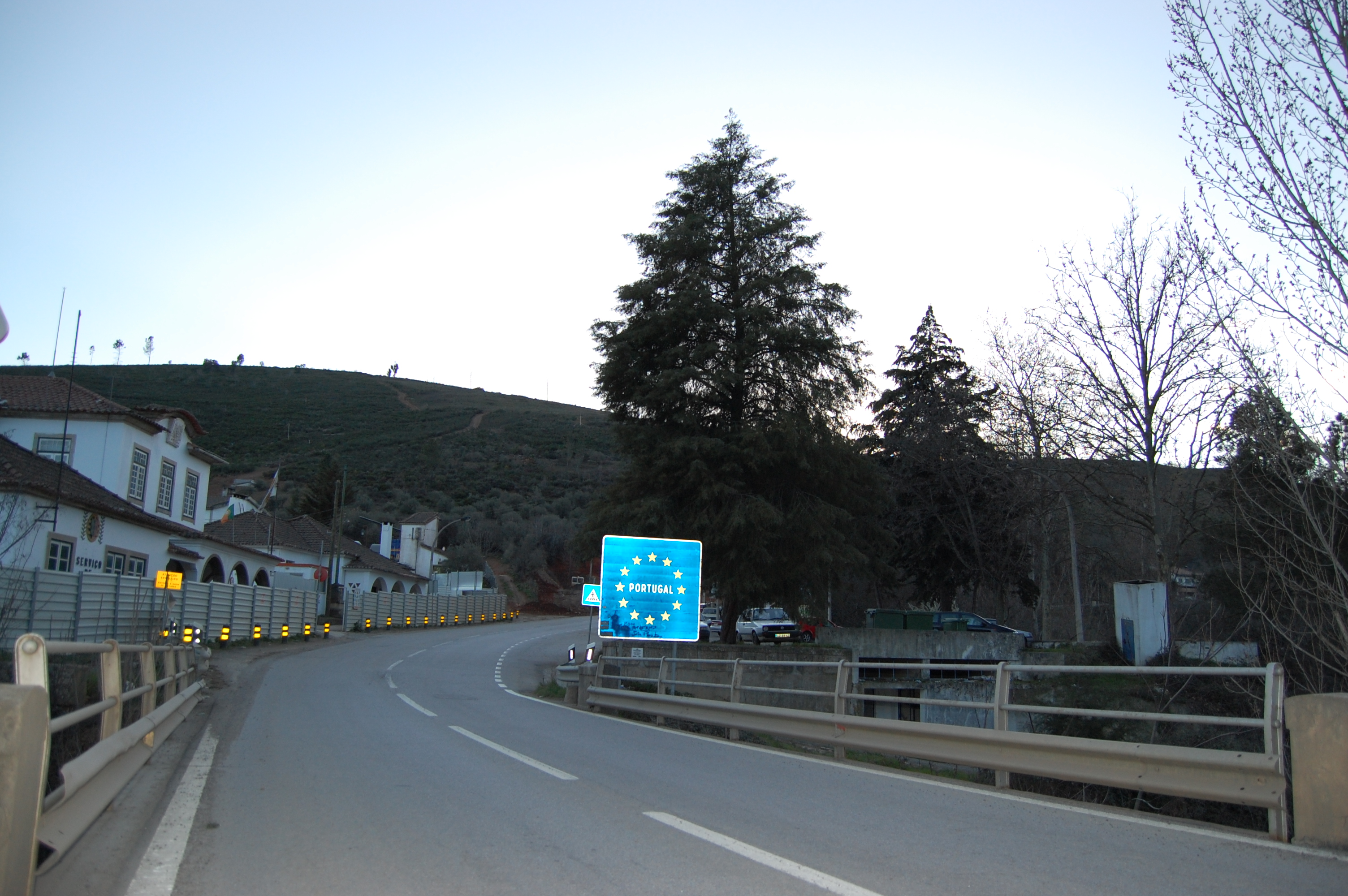

- Flag Coat of arms
- Interactive map of Trabazos
- Country: Spain
- Autonomous community: Castile and León
- Province: Zamora
- Municipality: Trabazos

Area
  - Total: 93 km^{2} (36 sq mi)

Population (2025-01-01)
  - Total: 848
  - Density: 9.1/km^{2} (24/sq mi)
- Time zone: UTC+1 (CET)
  - Summer (DST): UTC+2 (CEST)
- Website: Official website

The municipality of Trabazos (1,023 inhabitants in 2009; 9,345 ha) is located in the west of the Zamora Province, on the border with Portugal, 75 km from the provincial capital. The municipality is made of the five villages of Latedo, Nuez de Aliste, San Martín del Pedroso, Trabazos and Villarino Tras la Sierra.

== Flag and coat of arms ==
The flag and arms of Trabazos, designed by Vicente Tocino Letrado and Tomás Rodríguez Peñas, are prescribed by a Decree adopted on 30 March 2007 by the Municipal Council, signed on 25 July 2007 by the Mayor, and published on 2 August 2007 in the official gazette of Castile and León, No. 150, p. 16,077. The symbols are described as follows:

- Municipal flag: Rectangular panel with proportions 2:3, made of 11 horizontal stripes, the upper green and the other ones in turn white and red, five each; the green and red stripes 1/9th of the hoist, the white stripes 1/15th of the flag length.
- Coat of arms: Per fess, 1a. Azure a church argent masoned sable port and windows azure, 1b. Gules a fountain or, 2a. Gules a mill wheel argent, 2b. Argent a mountain vert, 2c. Vert a bend azure fimbriated argent a mill of the same. The shield surmounted by the Royal crown closed.

The municipal flag uses the same elements and colors as the flag of Zamora, the five red stripes representing here the five villages of the municipality. The coat of arms is explained in detail by Chany Sebastián in "La Opinión de Zamora," 13 Aug 2008.

== Town hall ==
Trabazos is home to the town hall of 5 villages:

- Trabazos (354 inhabitants, INE 2020).
- Nuez (288 inhabitants, INE 2020).
- San Martín del Pedroso (73 inhabitants, INE 2020).
- Latedo (58 inhabitants, INE 2020).
- Villarino Tras la Sierra (62 inhabitants, INE 2020).
