= Arcillera =

- Municipality
- Location in Spain
- Coordinates: 41°41′58.85″N 6°20′52.66″W
- Country: Spain
- Autonomous community: Castile and León
- Province: Zamora
- Comarca: Aliste
- Mancomunidad: Tierras de Aliste

Population (2021)
  - Total: 48
- Time zone: UTC+1 (CET)
  - Summer (DST): UTC+2 (CEST)
- Postal code: 49514

Arcillera is a small village in the province of Zamora, Spain, close to the border with Portugal.

A Celtic hoard of silver jewellery and denarii dating to approximately 20 BC was found in Arcillera in the early twentieth century. It is now mostly preserved in the collections of the British Museum.

== See also ==
- Cordoba Treasure for similar Celtic hoard
