= Samir de los Caños =

Coordinates: 41°40′N 6°10′W

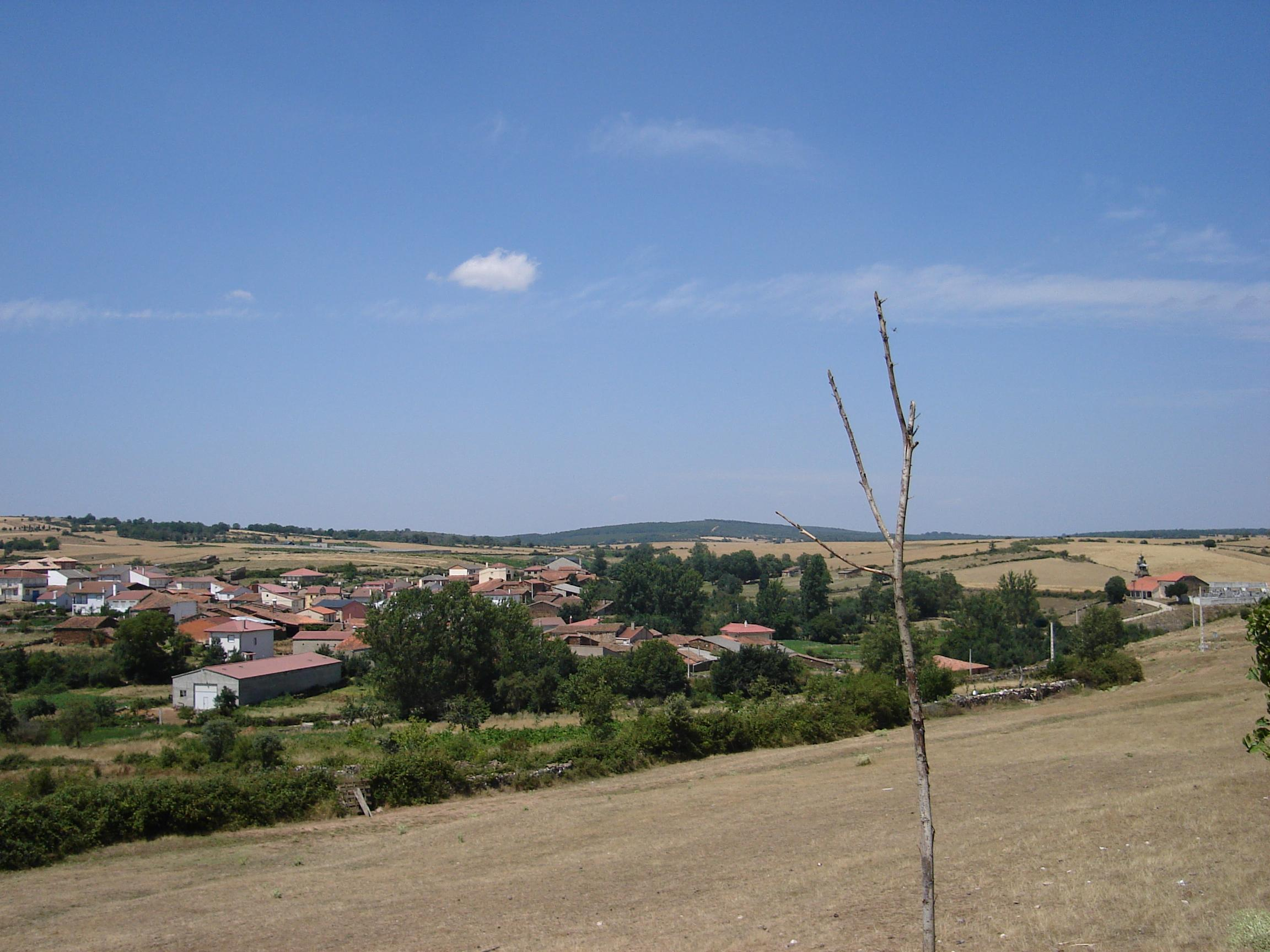

- Flag Coat of arms
- Interactive map of Samir de los Caños
- Country: Spain
- Autonomous community: Castile and León
- Province: Zamora
- Municipality: Samir de los Caños

Area
  - Total: 36 km^{2} (14 sq mi)

Population (2025-01-01)
  - Total: 158
  - Density: 4.4/km^{2} (11/sq mi)
- Time zone: UTC+1 (CET)
  - Summer (DST): UTC+2 (CEST)

Samir de los Caños is a municipality in the province of Zamora, Castile and León, Spain. According to the 2004 census (INE), the municipality has a population of 227 inhabitants. As of 2022, Samir de los Caños had 163 inhabitants.

== History ==
With the creation—in 1833—of the current provinces, Samir de los Caños was attached to the Zamora’s, within the Region of León, which, like all Spanish regions of the time, lacked administrative powers. A year later it was integrated into the Judicial District of Alcañices, a fact that lasted until 1983, when it was abolished and integrated into the Judicial District of Zamora. After the 1978 constitution, Samir became part of the autonomous community of Castilla y León in 1983, as a municipality integrated into the province of Zamora.
