= Rabanales =

Coordinates: 41°44′N 6°16′W

- Coat of arms
- Interactive map of Rabanales
- Country: Spain
- Autonomous community: Castile and León
- Province: Zamora
- Municipality: Rabanales

Area
  - Total: 80 km^{2} (31 sq mi)

Population (2025-01-01)
  - Total: 497
  - Density: 6.2/km^{2} (16/sq mi)
- Time zone: UTC+1 (CET)
  - Summer (DST): UTC+2 (CEST)
- Website: Official website

Rabanales is a municipality located in the province of Zamora, Castile and León, Spain. According to the 2004 census (INE), the municipality has a population of 767 inhabitants.

== Town hall ==
Rabanales is home to the town hall of 6 villages:

- Rabanales (191 inhabitants, INE 2020).
- Grisuela (98 inhabitants, INE 2020).
- Matellanes (94 inhabitants, INE 2020).
- Fradellos (50 inhabitants, INE 2020).
- Mellanes (41 inhabitants, INE 2020).
- Ufones (27 inhabitants, INE 2020).
