= Rábano de Aliste =

Coordinates: 41°45′N 6°26′W

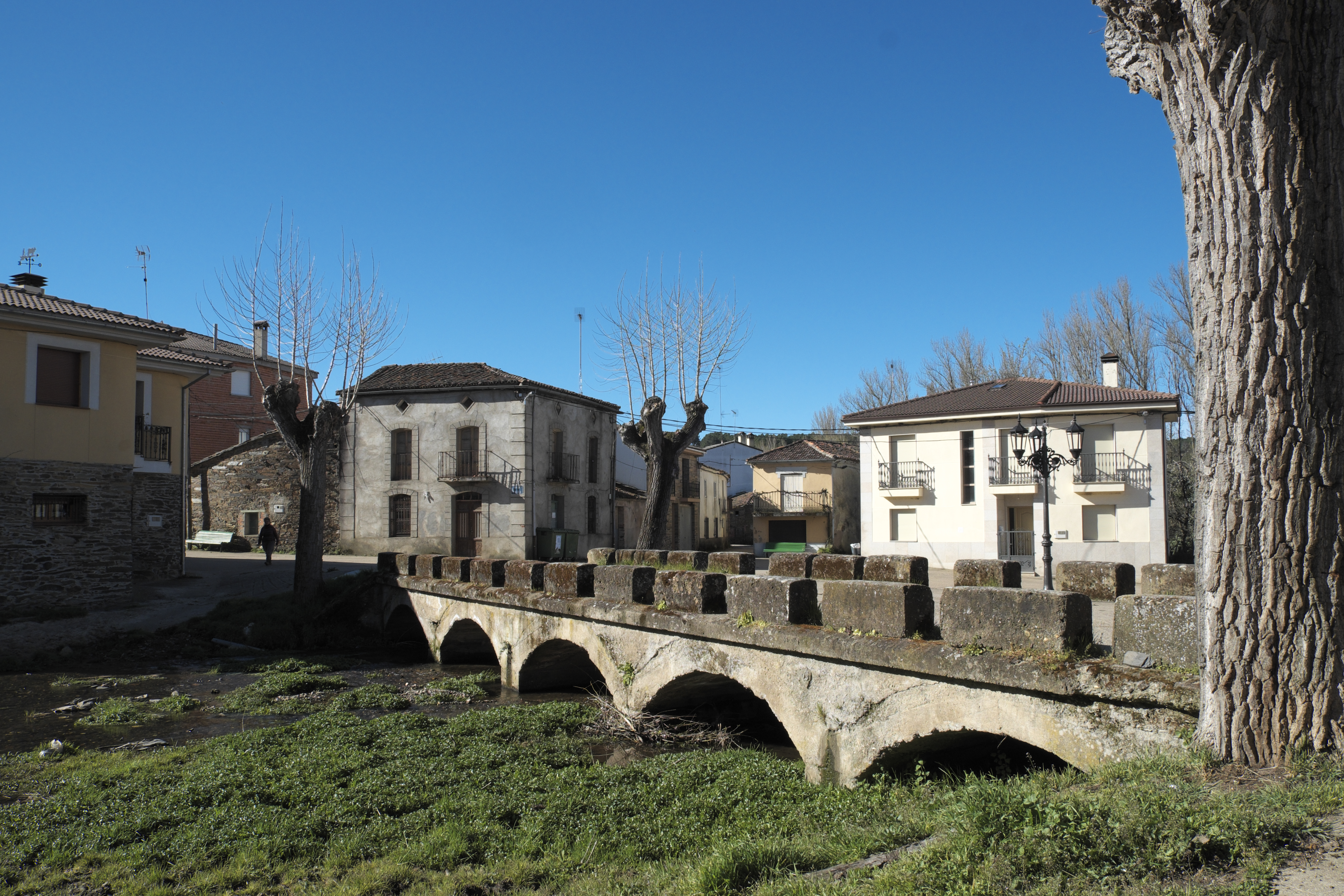
- Interactive map of Rábano de Aliste
- Country: Spain
- Autonomous community: Castile and León
- Province: Zamora
- Municipality: Rábano de Aliste

Area
  - Total: 55 km^{2} (21 sq mi)

Population (2025-01-01)
  - Total: 313
  - Density: 5.7/km^{2} (15/sq mi)
- Time zone: UTC+1 (CET)
  - Summer (DST): UTC+2 (CEST)
- Website: Official website

Rábano de Aliste is a municipality located in the province of Zamora, Castile and León, Spain. According to the 2004 census (INE), the municipality has a population of 450 inhabitants.

== Town hall ==
Rábano de Aliste is home to the town hall of 4 villages:

- Sejas de Aliste (123 inhabitants, INE 2020).
- Tola (107 inhabitants, INE 2020).
- Rábano de Aliste (78 inhabitants, INE 2020).
- San Mamed (45 inhabitants, INE 2020).
