= Ferreras de Abajo =

Coordinates: 41°54′N 6°05′W

Ferreras de Abajo, Spain
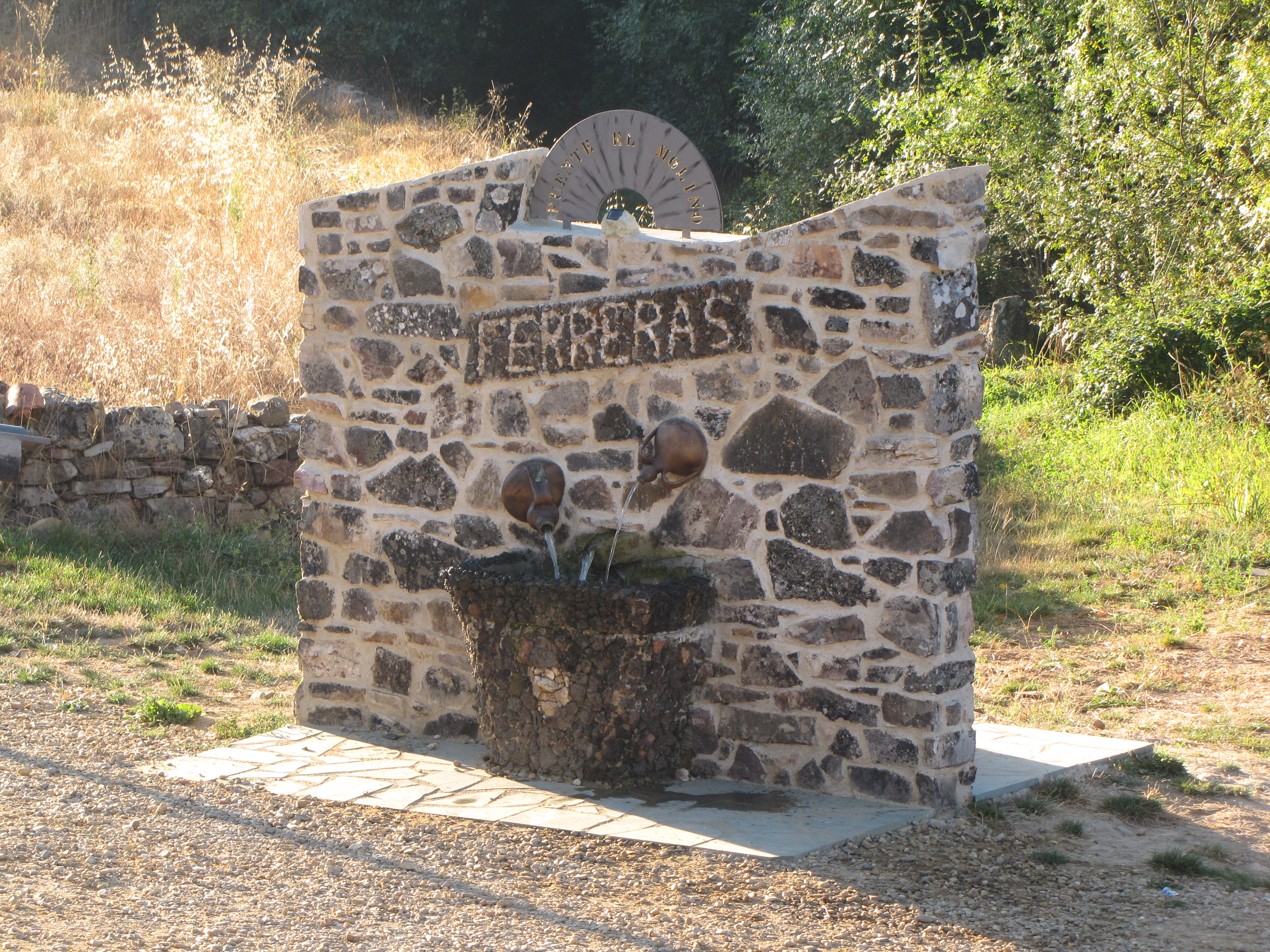

- Coat of arms
- Interactive map of Ferreras de Abajo, Spain
- Country: Spain
- Autonomous community: Castile and León
- Province: Zamora
- Municipality: Ferreras de Abajo

Area
  - Total: 88 km^{2} (34 sq mi)

Population (2025-01-01)
  - Total: 461
  - Density: 5.2/km^{2} (14/sq mi)
- Time zone: UTC+1 (CET)
  - Summer (DST): UTC+2 (CEST)
- Website: www.aytoferrerasabajo.es

Ferreras de Abajo is a municipality located in the province of Zamora, Castile and León, Spain. According to the 2009 census (INE), the municipality has a population of 601 inhabitants.

== Town hall ==
Ferreras de Abajo is home to the town hall of 2 towns:

- Ferreras de Abajo (377 inhabitants, INE 2020).
- Litos (102 inhabitants, INE 2020).
