= San Juan del Rebollar =

Town on Zamora, Spain

Coordinates: 41°45′N 6°21′W

San Juan del Rebollar is a small town of the province of Zamora, in north-western Spain. It is around 60 km (37 mi) from the city of Zamora.

It is a typical countryside Spanish village, consisting basically of a number of houses around a central square. The town is in a little valley, by the side of the Mena stream. The core of the town is here, although it has expanded up the sides of the valley and now part of the village is out of it. The economy has long been based on agriculture and cattle. Currently, most of its inhabitants have jobs outside the village, though they still grow cereals and vegetables, for animal feeding and human consumption.

The origin of San Juan come from the Middle Ages, and the town was probably founded by the time of the Spanish Reconquista. The name of the town, San Juan del Rebollar, is because it was once surrounded by a forest of "rebollos" (young oak trees).

The climate is the typical Castilian one. It is a continental type, with cold winters and mild summers. However, in the last few years, an increase in the summer temperature has been observed.
