= Riofrío de Aliste =

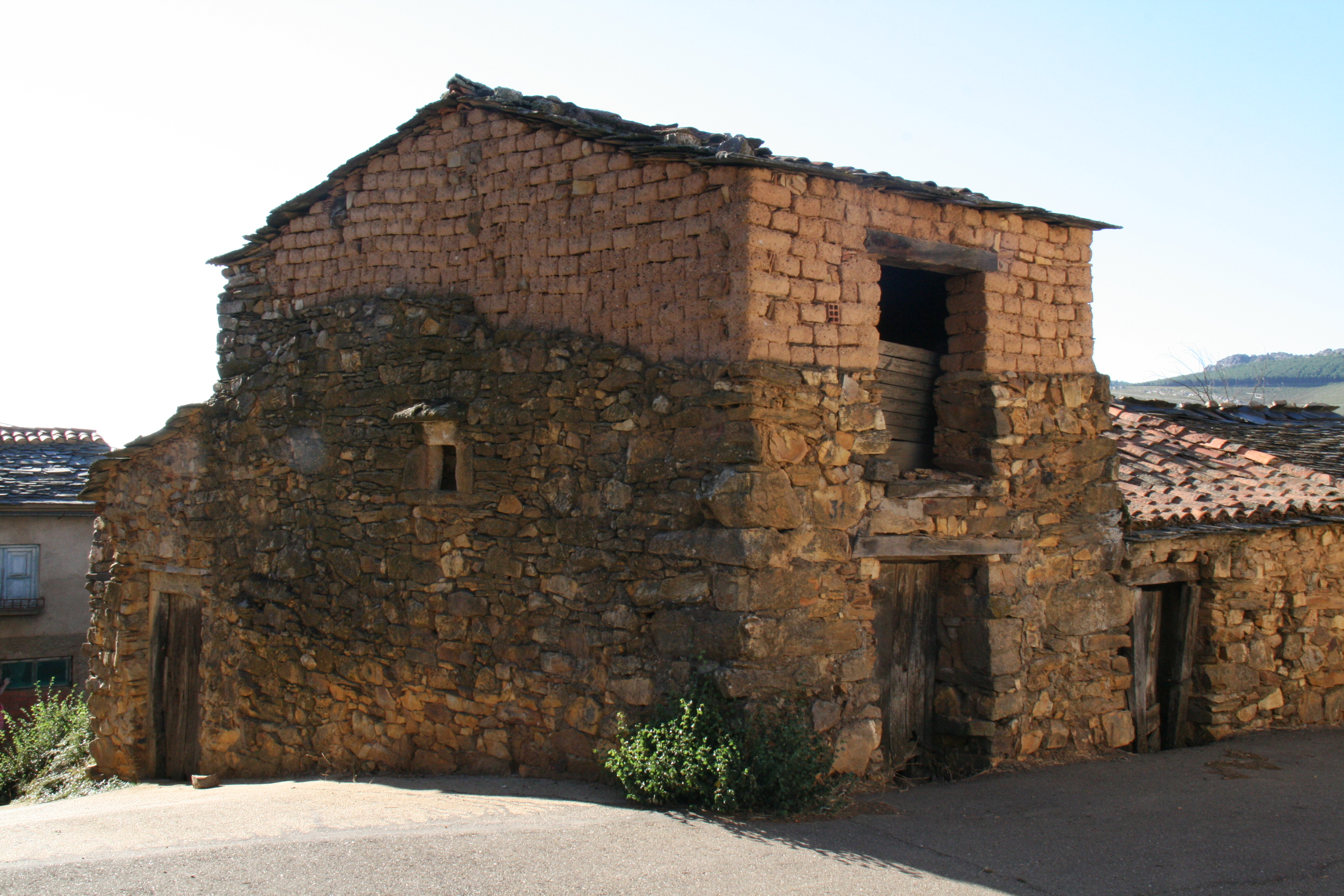

- Location in Spain.
- Coordinates: 41.8167°N 6.1667°W
- Country: Spain
- Autonomous community: Castile and León
- Province: Zamora
- Municipality: Riofrío de Aliste

Area
  - Total: 111 km^{2} (43 sq mi)

Population (2025-01-01)
  - Total: 589
  - Density: 5.31/km^{2} (13.7/sq mi)
- Time zone: UTC+1 (CET)
  - Summer (DST): UTC+2 (CEST)
- Website: Official website

Riofrío de Aliste is a municipality located in the province of Zamora, Castile and León, Spain. According to the 2004 census (INE), the municipality has a population of 1,019 inhabitants.

== Town hall ==
Riofrío de Aliste is home to the town hall of 4 towns:

- Sarracín de Aliste (230 inhabitants, INE 2020).
- Ríofrío de Aliste (217 inhabitants, INE 2020).
- Abejera (118 inhabitants, INE 2020).
- Cabañas de Aliste (70 inhabitants, INE 2020).
