= Mahíde =

Place in Castile and León, Spain

Mahíde de Aliste
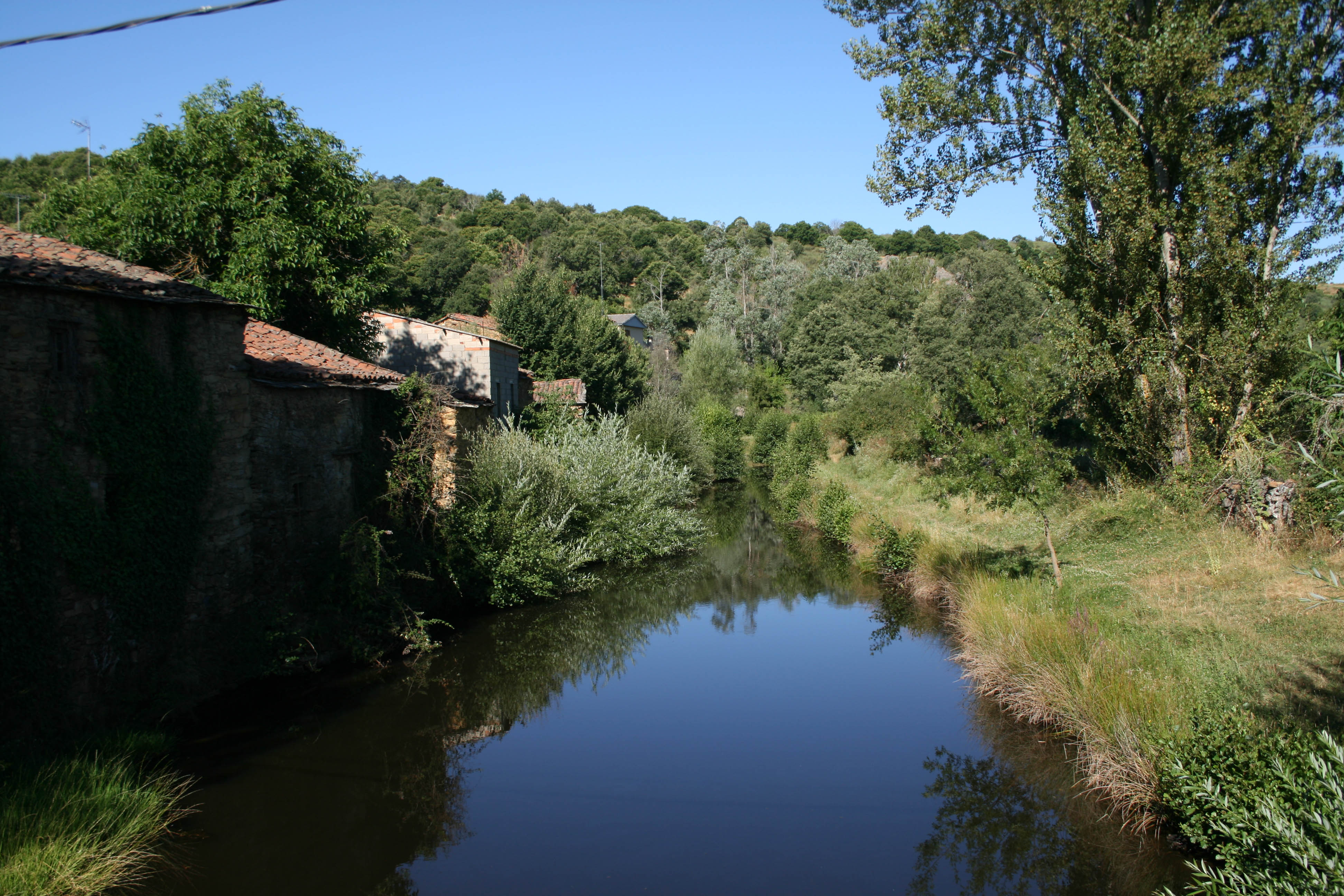
- Pobladura de Aliste
- Nickname: Mahíde
- Interactive map of Mahíde de Aliste
- Coordinates: 41°52′15″N 6°22′32″W
- Country: Spain
- Autonomous community: Castile and León
- Province: Zamora
- Municipality: Mahide de Aliste

Government
  - Alcalde: Juan Garrido Carballés (PP)

Area
  - Total: 108.82 km^{2} (42.02 sq mi)
- Elevation: 823 m (2,700 ft)

Population (2025-01-01)
  - Total: 299
  - Density: 2.75/km^{2} (7.12/sq mi)
- Data Source: INE
- Time zone: UTC+1 (CET)
  - Summer (DST): UTC+2 (CEST)
- Postal code: 49522
- Area code: (+34) 980 68

Mahíde de Aliste (Mahíde) is a municipality located in the province of Zamora, Castile and León, Spain. According to the 2007 census (INE), the municipality has a population of 446 inhabitants.

== Town hall ==
Mahíde is home to the town hall of 4 villages:

- Mahíde (100 inhabitants, INE 2020).
- Pobladura de Aliste (91 inhabitants, INE 2020).
- Las Torres de Aliste (59 inhabitants, INE 2020).
- Boya (53 inhabitants, INE 2020).
- San Pedro de las Herrerías (13 inhabitants, INE 2020).
