= ESADE Business School =

College and graduate school in Spain

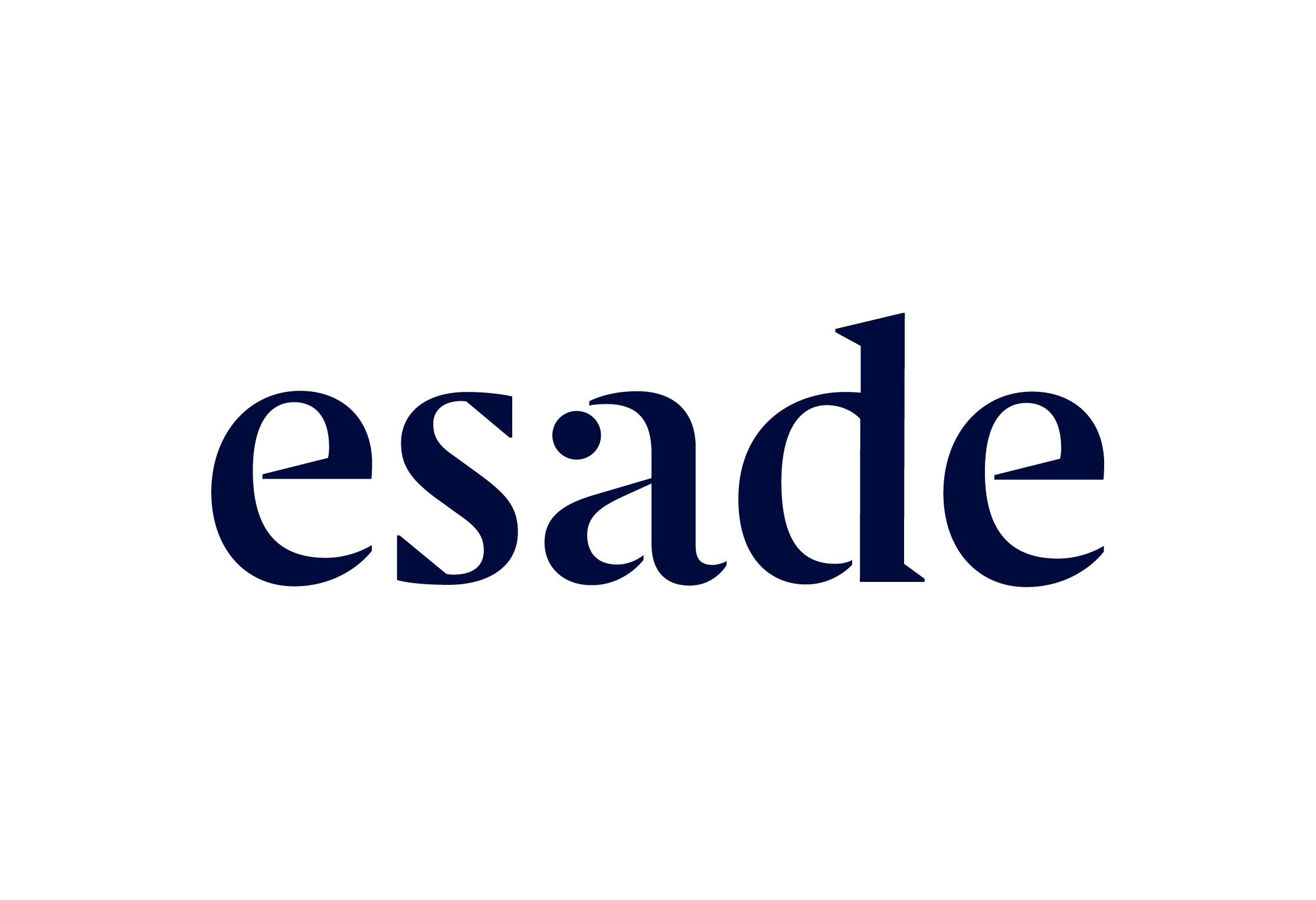
- Motto: Do Good. Do Better.
- Type: Private business school
- Established: 1958
- Accreditation: Triple accreditation
- Affiliations: Ramon Llull University
- Dean: Jorge Castiñeira, Lisa Hehenberger, Josep Franch
- Director: Koldo Echebarría
- Students: 7674
- Location: Av. Pedralbes, 60-62, 08034 Barcelona, Catalonia, Spain; 41°23′29″N 2°06′42″E
- Campus: Urban
- Website: http://www.esade.edu/

ESADE Business School is a private business school located in Barcelona, Spain. It is part of the ESADE (Catalan: Escola Superior d'Administració i Direcció d'Empreses, Spanish: Escuela Superior de Administración y Dirección de Empresas) and is associated with the Ramon Llull University. ESADE has been awarded the triple accreditation by the EQUIS, AACSB, and AMBA.

== History ==
The ESADE project was conceived in the spring of 1954 by a group of Spanish professionals and entrepreneurs during the period of isolation or autarchy initiated by Francisco Franco's dictatorship. Linked from the beginning to the Society of Jesus, they saw the need to professionalize the training of businessmen.

The school signed an agreement with the Jesuits (Societas Iesu) in October 1958 and started offering its first academic programmes in a small building in the district of Sant Gervasi, Barcelona. In 1958, ESADE was ultimately founded. Two years later, in 1960, executive education programmes were introduced as the Bachelor of Science in Business Administration. In 1964, the university's MBA programme was established. A year later, in 1965, ESADE's Barcelona campus (Pedralbes) opened (Building I). In 2009, Sant Cugat del Vallès campus was inaugurated. In 2025, the school inaugurated its campus in Madrid (Mirasierra).

== Programmes ==
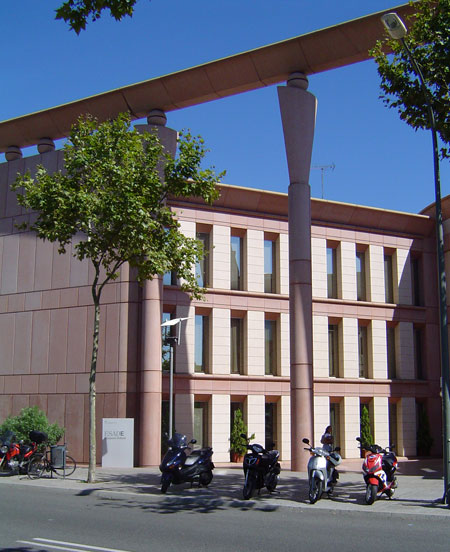
Building 3 at Esplugues de Llobregat avenue

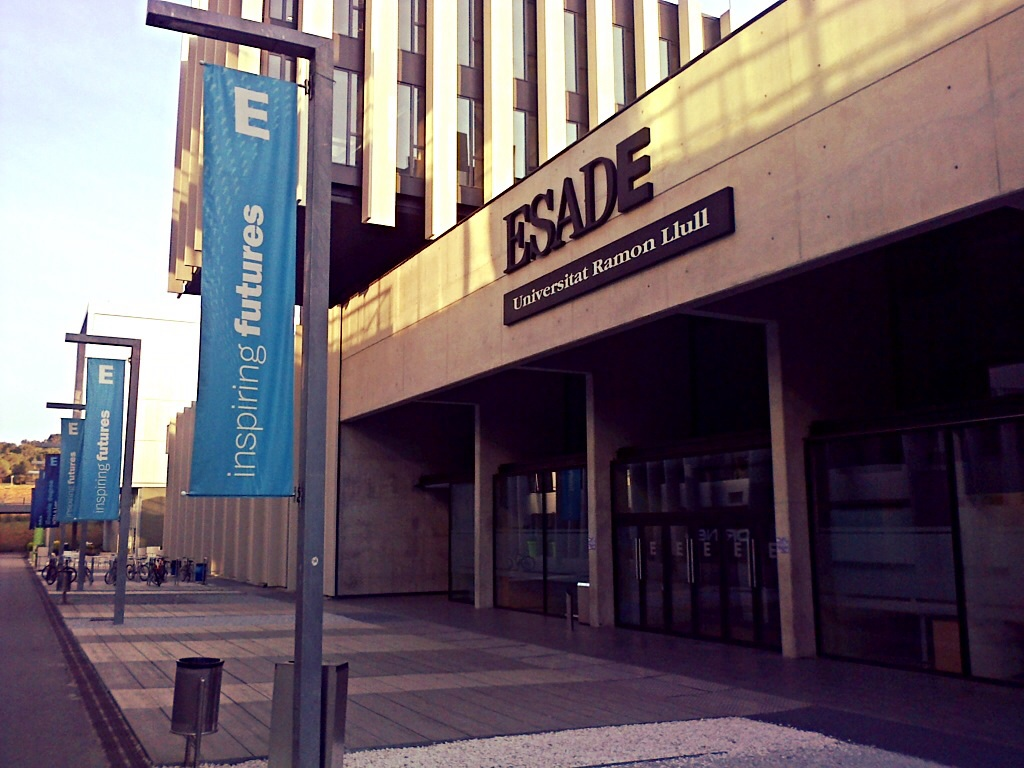
Sant Cugat del Vallès campus

ESADE Business School offers a range of undergraduate and graduate degrees, as well as doctoral programmes.

=== Bachelor's Programmes ===
- Bachelor in Business Administration
- Bachelor in Trasformational Leadership and Social Impact
- Bachelor in Global Governance, Economics and Legal Order
- Bachelor in Business and Artificial Intelligence
- Double Degree in Business Administration & Law
- Double Degree in Law + Global Governance, Economics & Legal Order
- Double Degree in BBA & Business and Artificial Intelligence
- Double Degree in Business Administration + Global Governance, Economics & Legal Order

=== MSc Programmes ===
- Global Master in International Management
- Global Master in Finance
- Master in Sustainability Management
- Master in Marketing Management
- Master in Innovation and Entrepreneurship
- Master in Business Analytics
- Master in Finance

=== Full-Time MBA ===
The ESADE Business School offers an accelerated, customisable full-time MBA programme. Students can choose between 12, 15 and 18-month tracks. The 12-month programme has classes from September to September of the following year, the 15-months programme has classes from September to December of the following year and the 18-month programme has classes from September to March of the following year. They allow for either summer internships, exchanges with other MBA programmes worldwide, and both. In the first eight months, students are divided into three sections, with whom they complete a significant portion of their studies in a team format. In the remaining terms, classes are completed on an elective basis. The student body is highly international, with 95% international students who represent 48 nationalities.

Business school rankings

Europe
- QS MBA: 6
- Financial Times MBA: 10

Global
- QS MBA: 13
- Financial Times MBA: 8

=== Executive Education ===
ESADE Business School offers a range of programmes aimed at executives and experienced professionals. These programmes include Executive MBA, Executive Master Programmes, InOn Programmes, Online Programmes, Open Programmes, and Blended Programmes.

=== PhD ===
The ESADE Business School offers a PhD programme aimed at training business school academics. It consists in two parts:

- A Master of Research in Management Sciences (MRes) (duration: 1 year)
- A PhD in Management Sciences (duration: 3 years)
- A PhD in the Fundamentals of Law, Economic Law, and Business Law (in Spanish)

== International Rankings ==
	2017	2018	2019	2020	2021	2022	2023
QS - World University Ranking for Master's in Management	-	3rd	3rd	4th	4th	6th	6th
QS - World University Ranking for Master's in Finance	-	6th	7th	10th	11th	14th	15th
QS - World University Ranking for Master's in Business Analytics	-	-	5th	7th	8th	9th	12th
QS - World University Ranking for Master's in Marketing	-	-	4th	7th	4th	6th	6th
Financial Times - World University Ranking for Master's in Management	8th	11th	11th	14th	16th	16th	8th
Financial Times - Master's in Finance	13th	14th	N.A.	18th	15th	18th	N.A.

== Notable alumni ==
- Albert Rivera (born 1979), Spanish politician
- Enrique Lores (born 1964/65), CEO of HP Inc.
- Ramon Laguarta (born 1964), CEO of PepsiCo
- Josep Maria Bartomeu (born 1963), Former President of FC Barcelona
- Ferran Soriano (born 1967), CEO of Manchester City F.C.
- Gabriel Escarrer Jaume (born 1971), Billionaire founder and CEO of Meliá Hotels International
- Joan Rigol (born 1943), Former President of the Parliament of Catalonia
- Iñaki Urdangarin (born 1968), Retired Spanish handball player
- Albert Ollé Bartolomé (born 1964), Pioneer of the Call and Contact Center industry in Spain
- Assumpta Escarp i Gibert (born 1957), Member of the Parliament of Catalonia for the Province of Barcelona
- Javier Faus (born 1964), Chairman and CEO of Meridian Capital Partners
- Javier Ferrán (born 1956), Chairman of Diageo
- Eva Granados (born 1975), Deputy of the Parliament of Catalonia for the Socialists' Party of Catalonia
- Sabina Fluxà (born 1980), Vice-Chairman and CEO of Iberostar Hotels & Resorts
- Patricia Gras (born 1960), American journalist, television anchor, reporter and producer
- Jordi Hereu (born 1965), 117th Mayor of Barcelona
- Alessandro Magnoli Bocchi (born 1968), Italian economist
- Irene Rigau (born 1951), Former Counselor of Education of Catalonia
- Sandro Rosell (born 1964), Former President of FC Barcelona
- Josep Maria Vallès (born 1940), Spanish academic and politician
- Risto Mejide (born 1974), Publicist, author, music producer, songwriter, talent show judge and TV presenter
- Ernesto Lucena, Minister of Sports of Colombia
- Xavier Espot Zamora (born 1979), Current Prime Minister of Andorra
- Jaume Guardiola Romojaro (born 1957), CEO of Banco Sabadell
- Joaquin Duato (born 1962), CEO of Johnson & Johnson

== See also ==
- List of Jesuit sites
- ESADE
- University Ramon Llull
- ESADE Law School
