= Fluxà =

Fluxà is a Spanish surname. Notable people with the surname include:

- Gloria Fluxà (born 1981), Spanish businessperson and environmentalist
- Miguel Fluxà Rosselló (born 1938), Spanish billionaire businessman
- Sabina Fluxà (born 1980), Spanish businesswoman
