= ESADE =

Private business and law school in Spain

Esade
- Escola Superior d'Administració i Direcció d'Empreses; Escuela Superior de Administración y Dirección de Empresas
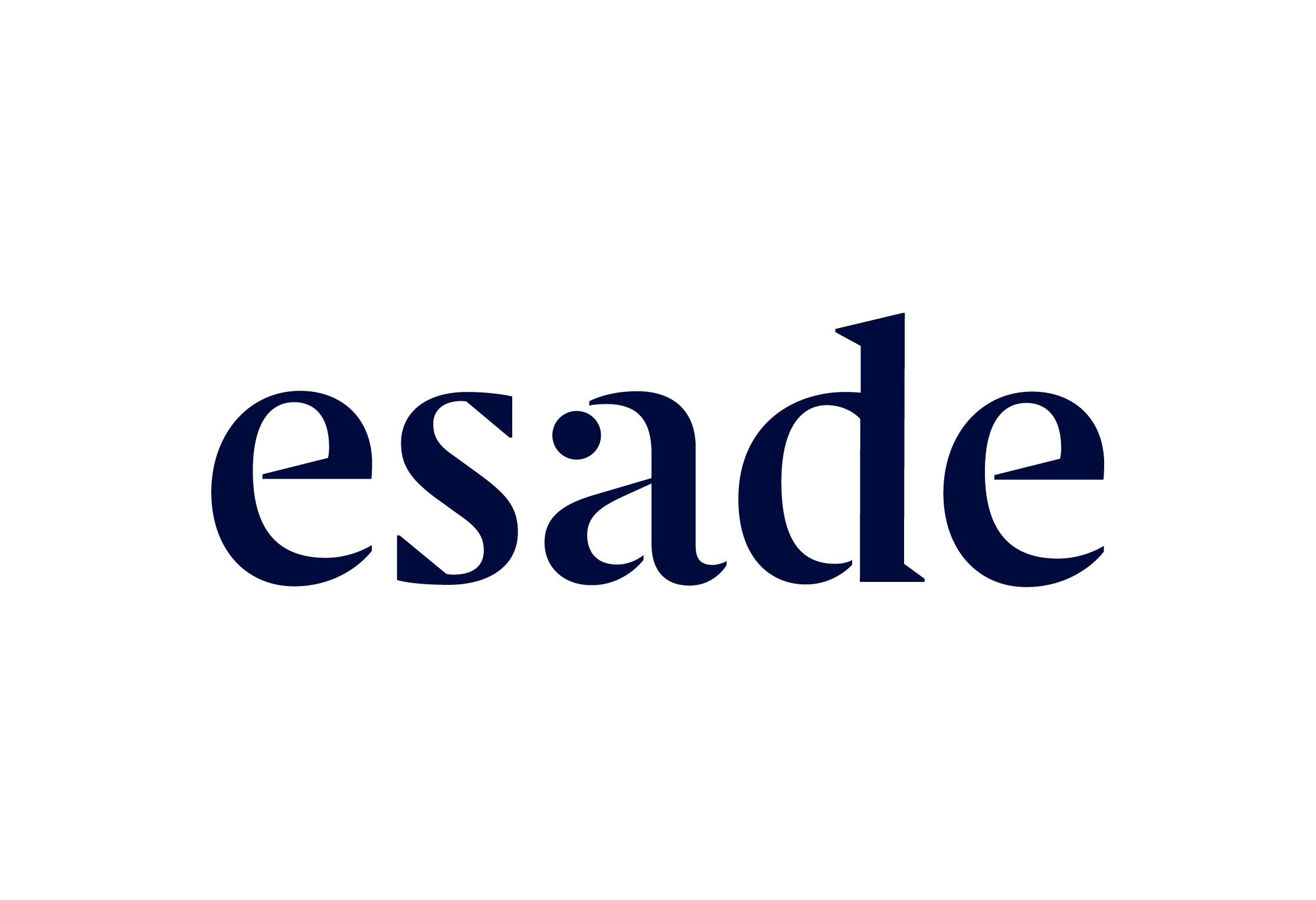
- Motto: Do Good. Do Better.
- Type: Private
- Established: 1958; 68 years ago
- Dean: Josep Franch Bullich (Esade Business School) Eduardo Berché Moreno (Esade Law School) David Dinwoodie (Esade Executive Education)
- Director: Koldo Echebarria
- Faculty: 307
- Administrative staff: 379
- Students: 10,600 (Business & Law, 2017)
- Location: Barcelona, Catalonia, Spain; 41°23′29″N 2°06′42″E
- Website: Esade

Esade (Catalan: Escola Superior d'Administració i Direcció d'Empreses, Spanish: Escuela Superior de Administración y Dirección de Empresas) is a private educational institution based in Barcelona, Spain. It runs two schools of the university, Esade Business School and Esade Law School, as well as a language centre, the Esade Executive Language Center. The school has also formed a strategic alliance with Ramon Llull University in its undergraduate programmes in Law and Business.

== History ==
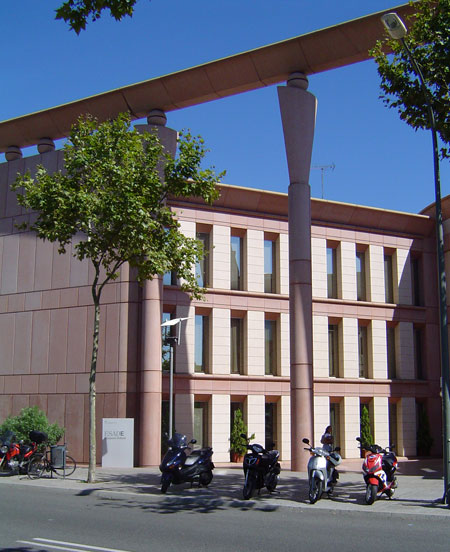
Building 3 at Esplugues avenue

The Esade project was conceived in the spring of 1954 by a group of Spanish professionals and entrepreneurs who later founded the university. The school signed an agreement with the Jesuits (Societas Iesu) in October 1958 and started offering its first academic programs in a small building in the district of Sarrià-Sant Gervasi, Barcelona.

In 1958, Esade was ultimately founded. Two years later, in 1960, executive education programmes were introduced. In 1964 the college's MBA programme was established. A year later, in 1965, ESADE's Barcelona campus (Av. Pedralbes) opened (Building I), as well as the Executive Language Centre. In 1993, Esade Law School opened. In 2001, the school inaugurated its campus in Madrid (Chamartín). In 2009 Esade opened a new campus in Sant Cugat del Vallès (Barcelona) as well as Esade Creapolis, a technology park based on open innovation and situated on the new Sant Cugat campus.

Today Esade's campuses, if the premises in both Madrid and Barcelona are included, cover an area of 30,000 m^{2} (36,000 sq yd).

== Esade Creapolis ==
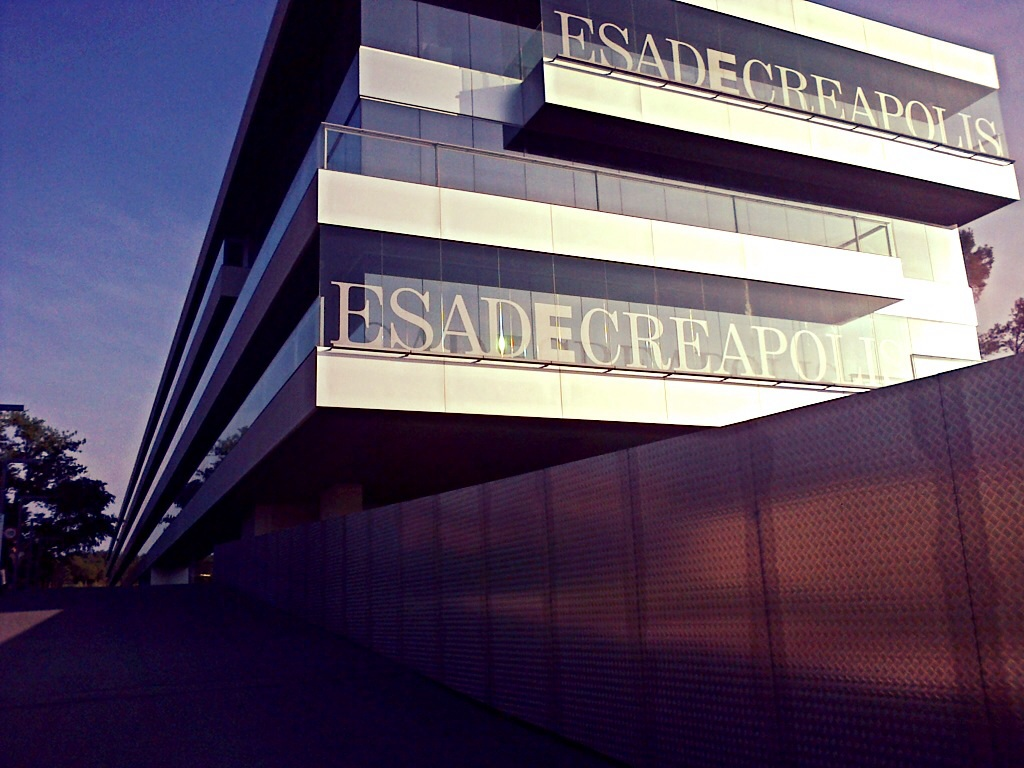
Esade Creapolis

Esade Creapolis is a joint venture between Esade, a consortium of Spanish financial institutions, local government institutions and business associations. The organisation manages a technology and innovation park on the Esade campus in Sant Cugat del Vallès, Barcelona. It is an open innovation centre promoted by Esade business school, where companies, students, the academic community and scientists come together intending to promote both creativity and innovation. Between 2005 and 2008 Esade Creapolis invested €70 Million in its facilities in Sant Cugat and has since become home to various startups.

== International rankings ==
	2017	2018	2019	2020	2021	2022	2023	2024
QS - World University Ranking for Master's in Management (MSc in Management)	-	3rd	3rd	4th	4th	6th	6th	8th
QS - World University Ranking for Master's in Finance (MSc in Finance)	-	6th	7th	10th	11th	14th	15th	15th
QS - World University Ranking for Master's in Business Analytics (MSc in Business Analytics)	-	-	5th	7th	8th	9th	12th	18th
QS - World University Ranking for Master's in Marketing (MSc in Marketing Management)	-	-	4th	7th	4th	6th	6th	6th
Financial Times - Master's in Management	8th	11th	11th	14th	16th	16th	8th	-
Financial Times - Master's in Finance	13th	14th	N.A.	18th	15th	18th	N.A.	-
QS - Global MBA	N.A.	17th	13th	17th	13th	13th	17th	19th

== Notable alumni ==
- Enrique Lores (born 1964/65), CEO of HP Inc.
- Ramon Laguarta (born 1964), CEO of PepsiCo
- Ferran Soriano (born 1967), CEO of Manchester City F.C.
- Joaquin Duato (born 1962), CEO of Johnson & Johnson
- Gabriel Escarrer Jaume (born 1971), Founder and CEO of Meliá Hotels International
- Xavier Espot Zamora (born 1979), Current Prime Minister of Andorra
- Jaume Guardiola Romojaro (born 1957), CEO of Banco Sabadell
- Javier Ferrán (born 1956), Chairman of Diageo
- Albert Rivera (born 1979), a Spanish politician
- Josep Maria Bartomeu (born 1963), Former President of FC Barcelona
- Joan Rigol (born 1943), Former President of the Parliament of Catalonia
- Iñaki Urdangarin (born 1968), Retired Spanish handball player
- Assumpta Escarp i Gibert (born 1957), Member of the Parliament of Catalonia for the Province of Barcelona
- Javier Faus (born 1964), Chairman and CEO of Meridian Capital Partners
- Eva Granados (born 1975), Deputy of the Parliament of Catalonia for the Socialists' Party of Catalonia
- Sabina Fluxà (born 1980), Vice-Chairman and CEO of Iberostar Hotels & Resorts
- Patricia Gras (born 1960), American journalist, television anchor, reporter and producer
- Jordi Hereu (born 1965), 117th Mayor of Barcelona
- Alessandro Magnoli Bocchi (born 1968), Italian economist
- Irene Rigau (born 1951), Former Counselor of Education of Catalonia
- Sandro Rosell (born 1964), Former President of FC Barcelona
- Josep Maria Vallès (born 1940), a Spanish academic and politician
- Risto Mejide (born 1974), Publicist, author, music producer, songwriter, talent show judge and TV presenter

== See also ==
- List of Jesuit sites
