= Faus =

Faus is a Spanish surname. Notable people with the surname include:

- Ángel Faus Belau (1936–2020), Spanish journalist and academic
- Imma Tor Faus (born 1966), Andorran professor and diplomat
- Javier Faus (born 1964), Spanish businessman
