= Xavier Coller i Porta =

Spanish sociologist and journalist

Xavier Coller i Porta is a sociologist and journalist.

== Biography ==
He was born in Valencia, Spain.

He got his PhD from Yale University and Universitat Autònoma de Barcelona. In 2003 he received the Seymour Martin Lipset award from Princeton University, and in 2004 he was awarded Yale's Sussman Dissertation Prize. He taught at Yale, Georgetown, Europea de Madrid, UAB, UPF, UB, Alacant and ESADE.

He has authored about thirty publications. Recent works include Cànon sociològic (2003) and Anàlisi d'organitzacions (2004).
