= Hotel Melia Recoleta Plaza =

Boutique hotel in Buenos Aires, Argentina

Meliá Recoleta Plaza
- Hotel chain: Meliá Hotels International

General information
- Location: Recoleta, Buenos Aires, Argentina, Posadas 1557
- Opening: January 2006

Technical details
- Floor count: 8

Other information
- Number of rooms: 57

Website
- www.melia.com/en/hotels/argentina/buenos-aires/melia-recoleta-plaza

Meliá Recoleta Plaza is a boutique hotel in Buenos Aires's Recoleta neighbourhood, occupying an eight-storey building built in the French academicist style in the late 1920s. Operated under the Meliá Hotels International brand, the 57-room property opened in January 2006.

The building is also linked to Eva Duarte, who reportedly lived in an apartment there from 1942 to 1944, before her marriage to Juan Perón. No contemporary lease records survive, but a plaque attributed to the Buenos Aires City Legislature, together with the hotel's own signage, commemorates her residence at the address.

== History and architecture ==
The building was originally two towers of furnished studio apartments, linked by a ground-floor corridor around a shared courtyard. When it was converted into a hotel, its street façade, staircases and lift shafts were preserved, and a plaque at the entrance still identifies the earlier apartment complex by its original name, the Golden Residence.

Spanish lawyer José María Lafuente bought the building in 2004. The following year, El Cronista newspaper reported that an investment group was preparing to open it as the Meliá Recoleta Plaza Boutique Hotel, with 57 rooms split between the two eight-storey towers. By late January 2006 the hotel was operating, initially under the Sol Meliá name—the company's former corporate name before it became Meliá Hotels International in 2011.

A 2019 municipal tax-incentive programme in Buenos Aires listed the hotel among 37 approved renovation projects citywide, with its share of the planned investment put at between AR$30 million and AR$50 million.

== Association with Eva Perón ==
La Nación newspaper reported in 2019 that Duarte took a fourth-floor unit in 1942, shortly after finding steady work as a radio actress; the building stood half a block from the Radio Belgrano studios where she performed in radio dramas.

Architectural historian Eduardo Masllorens has suggested that the apartments were let furnished and without formal contracts, which would explain why no tenancy paperwork from the period has turned up. The hotel points to room 41 as the unit Duarte occupied, and a plaque dated 28 March 2012 and attributed to the Buenos Aires City Legislature states that she remained there until 1944. That room later became the Evita Suite, furnished with memorabilia acquired after the building's conversion into a hotel.

== Facilities ==
When it opened, the hotel offered a jazz club, a bistro, a café, a solarium, a whirlpool, a garden terrace and a beauty centre. Its current facilities include a restaurant, a private jazz venue, a spa, a gym and rooftop terraces.
