= Ramón Laguarta =

Spanish business executive (born 1963)

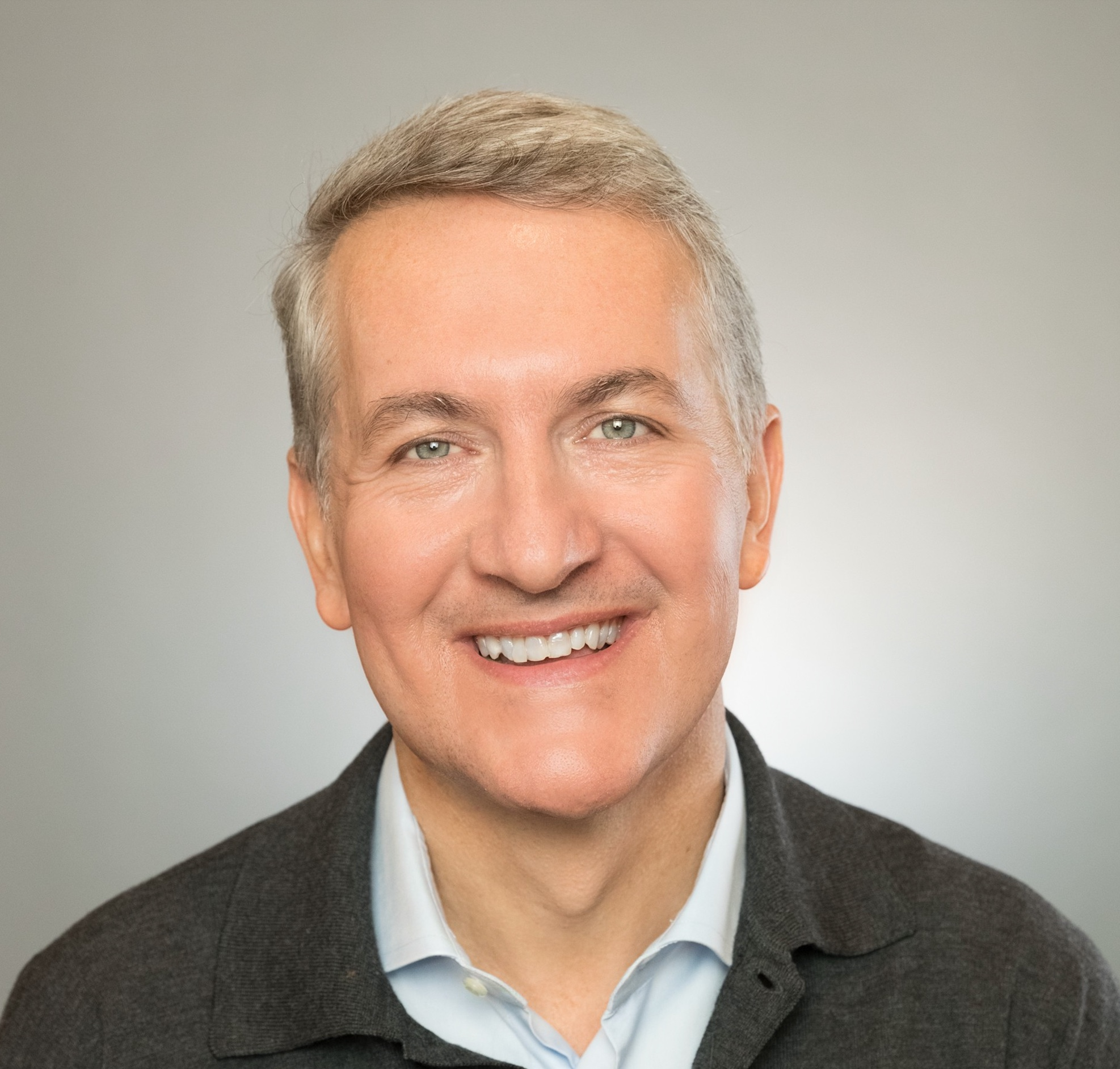
- Born: 1963 (age 62–63); Barcelona, Spain
- Education: ESADE (BBA, MBA); Thunderbird School of Global Management (MS)
- Title: CEO of PepsiCo
- Predecessor: Indra Nooyi

Ramón Laguarta (born 1963) is a Spanish businessman who is the chairman and chief executive officer of PepsiCo. He became CEO on 3 October 2018. He is the sixth CEO in the company's history and the first Spanish CEO of a large American multinational company.

== Education ==
Laguarta graduated with bachelor's and master's degrees in business administration from ESADE Business School in Barcelona in 1985. In 1986 he received a master's degree in international management from the Thunderbird School of Global Management.

== Career ==
Before joining PepsiCo he worked at Chupa Chups, a candy company based in Spain known for its lollipops. Laguarta joined PepsiCo in January 1996. His first role was in the company's European business, and in 2014 became the CEO of the entire Europe and Sub-Saharan Africa (ESSA) sector. While working in Europe, Laguarta helped lead the acquisition in 2010 of Russian dairy and juice company Wimm-Bill-Dann, a deal valued at $5.4 billion, the company's second largest acquisition after its purchase of Quaker Oats in 2001.

Laguarta was named president of PepsiCo in September 2017. He oversaw PepsiCo's Global Category Groups, its Global Operations, Corporate Strategy and Public Policy & Government Affairs functions. As a result of the promotion, he moved to the United States.

Laguarta was voted in as PepsiCo's next CEO on 6 August 2018, the same day Indra Nooyi announced she was stepping down. He officially took over the role on 3 October 2018 and became chairman on 1 February 2019. Laguarta has been working at PepsiCo for over 20 years, his previous roles including CEO for Europe Sub-Saharan Africa, president for the PepsiCo Eastern Europe Region, commercial Vice President for PepsiCo Europe, general manager for Iberia Snacks and Juices and General Manager for Greece Snacks. Since becoming CEO of PepsiCo, Laguarta named three priorities: accelerating organic revenue growth; becoming a stronger company; and becoming a better company.

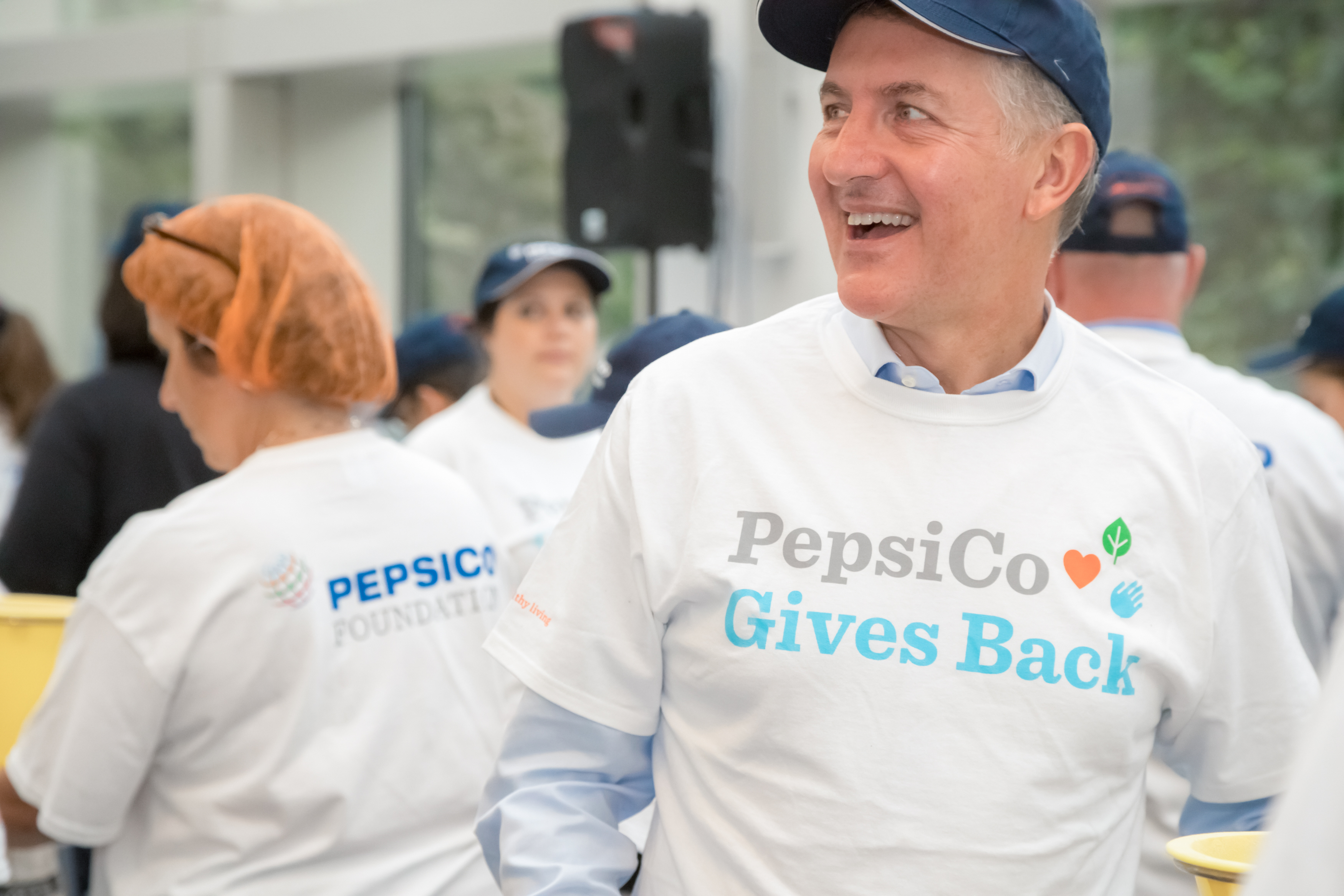
Ramon Laguarta at a PepsiCo Community Event

This includes the company's effort to reduce absolute greenhouse gas emissions by at least 20 percent for their entire value chain over a 2015 baseline (roughly 30-35 million metric tons of GHG), as well as their goals by 2025 to make 100% of their packaging recyclable, compostable, or biodegradable and use 25% recycled plastic content in all plastic packaging. Laguarta has also led attempts to reduce waste by acquiring SodaStream.

In 2023, Laguarta's total compensation from PepsiCo was $26.2 million, up 8% from the previous year and representing a CEO-to-median worker pay ratio of 648-to-1.

In addition to being a member of the PepsiCo Board of Directors, Laguarta is a director of Visa Inc. He is the co-chair of the World Economic Forum's board of stewards for the Food Systems Initiative.

== Personal life ==
Laguarta speaks English, Spanish, Catalan, French, German and Greek. He is married, with three children.
