= Gloria Fluxà =

Spanish businessperson and environmentalist

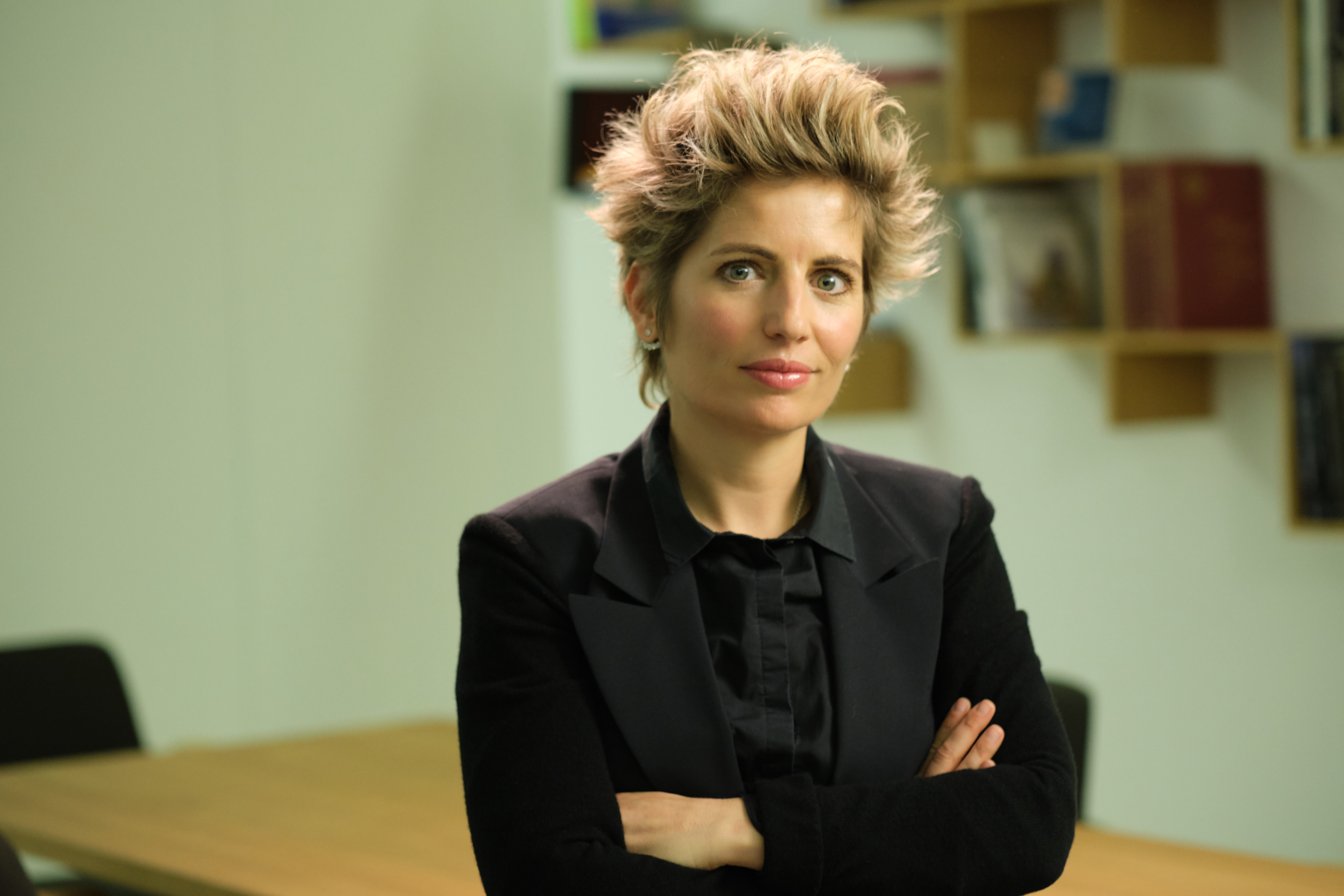
- Fluxà in 2019
- Born: June 1981 (age 44)
- Education: Villanova University (BA, MBA)
- Occupation: Businessperson
- Title: Vice-chairman and chief sustainability officer, Iberostar Hotels & Resorts
- Father: Miguel Fluxà Rosselló
- Relatives: Sabina Fluxà (sister); Llorenç Fluxà Figuerola (grandfather)

Gloria Fluxà Thienemann (born June 1981) is a Spanish businessperson. She is vice-chairman and chief sustainability officer of the family business, Iberostar Hotels & Resorts.

== Education ==
Fluxà has degrees in Business Administration from Villanova University and Accelerated Executive Development Program at IMD Business School. She participated in the Owner/President Management Program, Harvard Business School, Boston, US.

== Career ==
In January 2005, Fluxà joined the family business, Iberostar Group. Since 2018 she holds the position of vice-chairman and chief sustainability officer. She is a trustee and the chairman of Iberostar Foundation, member of the board at Endeavor Spain and member of the international advisory board at the Swiss Hospitality Management School in Lausanne.

In May 2018, she was named a “Young Global Leader” by the World Economic Forum due to her efforts in advancing the company's approach to sustainable tourism, particularly in the area of marine and oceans preservation with the movement “Wave of Change”. This project is focused on three areas: reducing plastic consumption, promoting sustainable fishing and improving coastal health.
