= Alessandro Magnoli Bocchi =

Italian economist (born 1968)

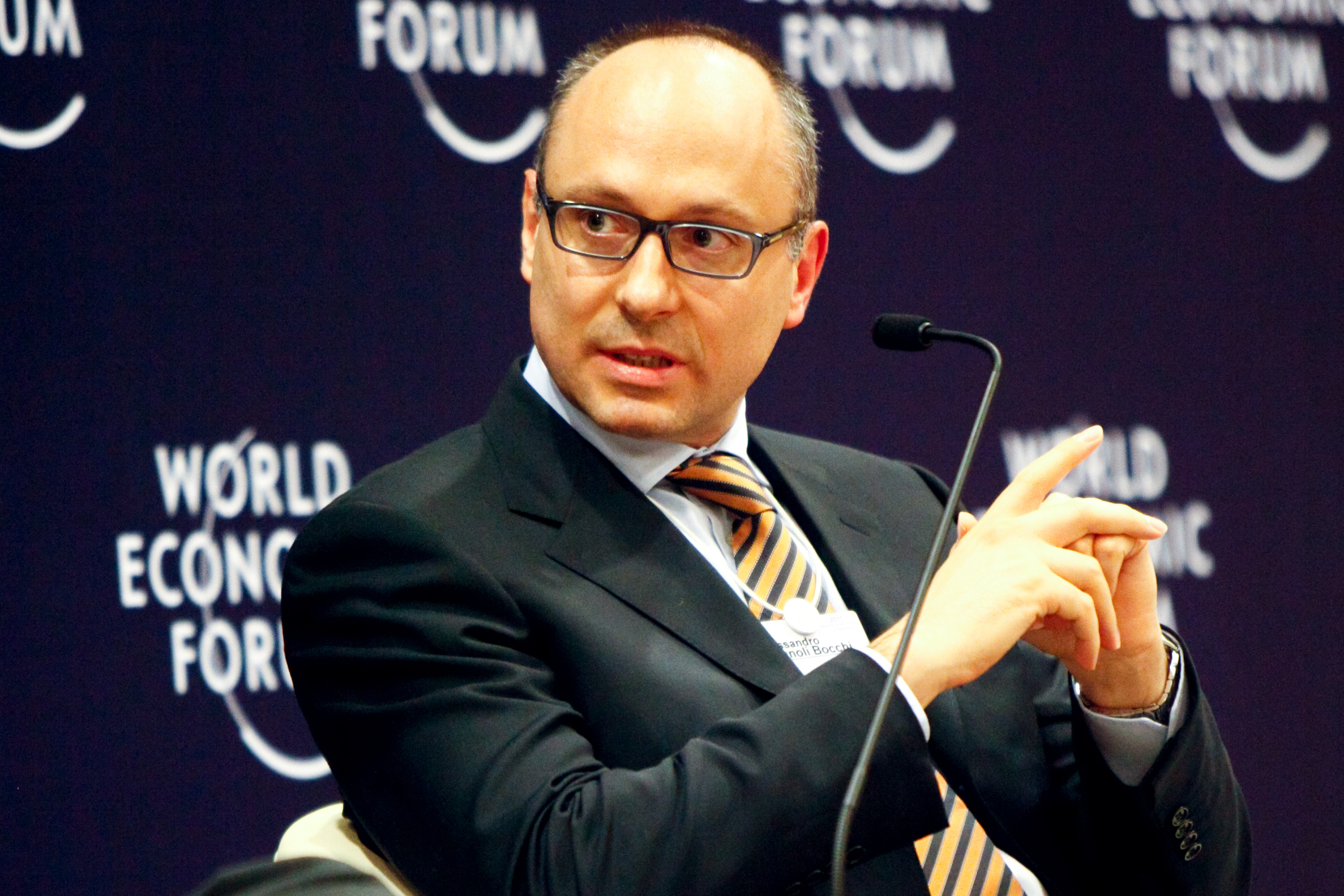
- Speaking at World Economic Forum, 2011
- Born: 25 April 1968 (age 58); Cremona, Italy

Academic background
- Education: Bocconi University; ESADE Business School; University of Parma; University of Milan
- Doctoral advisor: Rob Vos

Academic work
- Discipline: International economics Macroeconomics; Business economics Investment strategy Asset management
- Institutions: World Bank, 2001-2012; Harvard University, 1998-2001; Inter-American Development Bank, 1995-1998; Pirelli, 1993-1995; ESADE, 1993-1995
- Website: Information at IDEAS / RePEc

Alessandro Magnoli Bocchi (born 25 April 1968) is an Italian economist, investment professional and manager.

== Biography ==
Born in 1968 in Cremona, Italy, he graduated from Liceo Classico "Daniele Manin". In 1986 he moved to Milan, Italy to attend Bocconi University. From 1992 to 1995 he lived in Barcelona, Spain where he studied and taught at ESADE and worked at Pirelli. In 1995 he moved to Washington, DC, USA to work at the Inter-American Development Bank. In 1999 he joined Harvard University as a Research Associate and earned a Ph.D. from ESADE. In 2001 he returned to Washington, DC, recruited by the World Bank Young Professionals Program (YPP); while at the World Bank, he was stationed in Bangkok, Thailand from 2004 to 2006. In 2008 he joined the Kuwait China Investment Company in Kuwait. In 2012, he founded Foresight Advisors, an advisory consultancy focusing on company restructuring and asset management.

== Career ==
Over the past 30 years, he has worked in the fields of economic analysis, business management and international investments in Europe, the US, Asia, the Middle East, Latin America, and Africa. Currently he is Founder and CEO of Foresight Advisors.

Previously, he was: 1) Chief economist and member of the Investment Committee at the Kuwait China Investment Company, where he focused on international investments and economic research; 2) Senior economist at the World Bank (YPP 2000), working in East Asia, Africa, Middle East, and Eastern Europe in the fields of macroeconomics, growth, public finance, infrastructure and energy; 3) Research associate at Harvard University, School of Public Health, where he focused on financing and policy reform in Africa and Latin America; 4) Economist at the Inter-American Development Bank, concentrating on public policy in Latin America and the Caribbean; 5) Assistant manager at Pirelli/Spain in the Organization and Information Systems Department; and 6) Teaching assistant at ESADE/Department of Economics.

His main interests include macroeconomics, fiscal and monetary policy, public finance and welfare theory, investment strategy and asset management, and international law.

He holds a B.A. in economics and management from Bocconi University, Milan, a CEMS Master in International Management from Bocconi University/ESADE, a graduate degree in law from University of Parma, a MSs in Politics, Philosophy and Public Affairs (PPPA) from the University of Milan and a Ph.D. in economics and management from ESADE, Barcelona. In 1993, he became Dottore Commercialista, Italian diploma for qualified chartered accountant, fiscal and business consultant. In 2009, he attended the Oxford University Business Economics Programme (OUBEP).

== Works ==
=== Books ===
- In 2003, he authored What do you mean?, a book on efficiency and equity in social services delivery, by IADB/Johns Hopkins University Press.
- In 2007, he co-authored The World Bank, a book in Italian by Il Mulino.
- In 2008, he co-authored Reshaping Economic Geography in East Asia, a book by the World Bank.
- In 2023, he authored The Future of Democracy, a book in Italian by Il Sole 24 Ore.

=== Selected papers ===
- Rising growth, declining investment: the puzzle of the Philippines. English (World Bank Working Paper Series);
- Reaching the millennium development goals: Mauritania should care. English (World Bank Working Paper Series);
- NHA in Latin America and Caribbean. Concepts, Results and Policy Uses. English and Spanish (IADB/INDES Working Paper Series); and
- Mind the Gap. Suggestions on How to Bridge Gender Gaps in Developing Regions. English and Spanish (IADB/INDES Working Paper Series).
