= Dion Weisler =

HP Inc. CEO

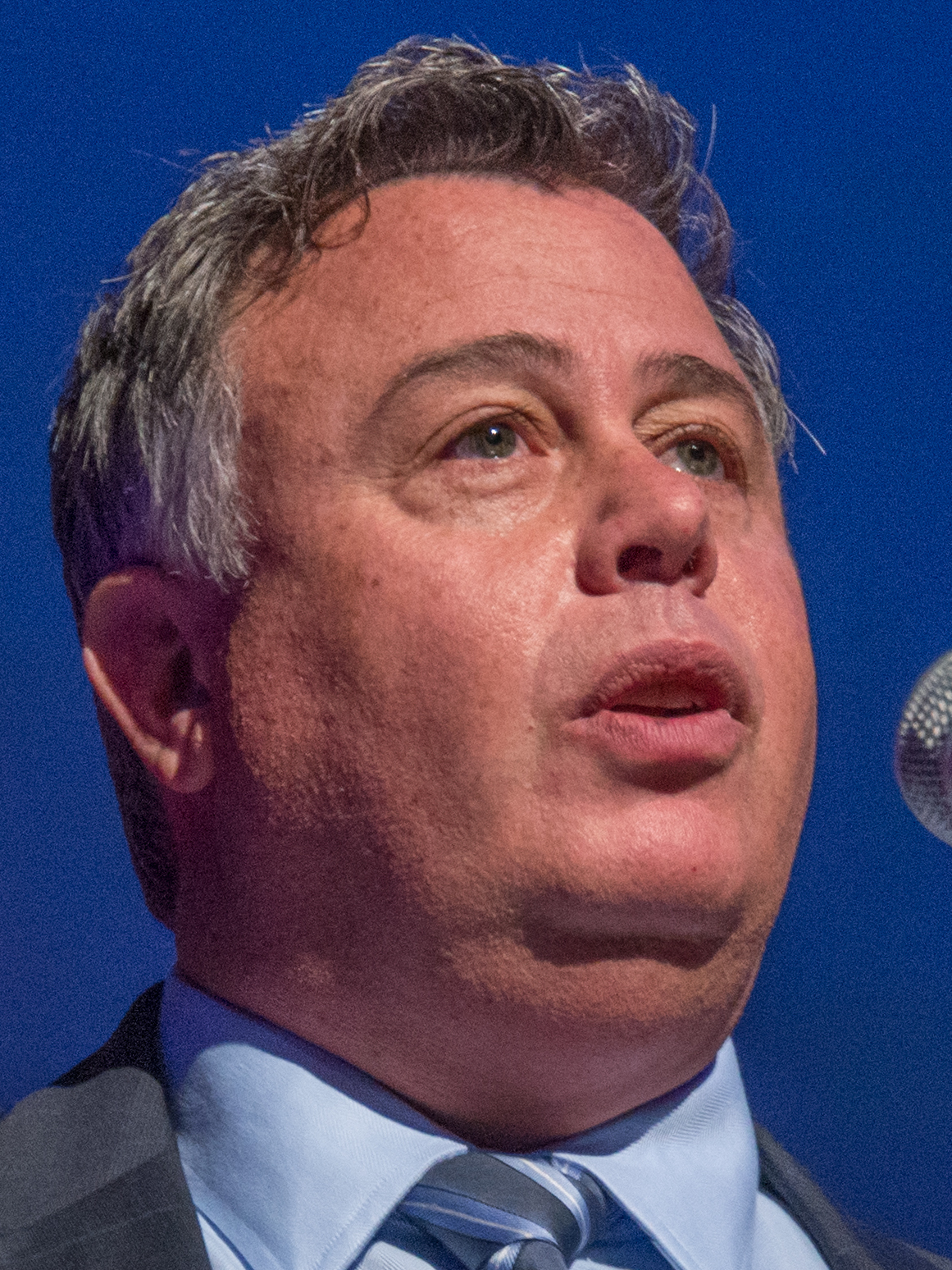
- Weisler in 2016
- Born: August 20, 1967 (age 59); Australia
- Education: Monash University
- Occupation: Businessman
- Title: Former chief executive officer and president, HP Inc
- Term: November 2015 – November 2019
- Predecessor: Meg Whitman
- Successor: Enrique Lores
- Spouse: married
- Children: 2

Dion Joseph Weisler (born 20 August 1967) is an Australian-born businessman, and was the chief executive officer and president of HP Inc. from November 2015, when HP Inc. and Hewlett Packard Enterprise split into separate companies, to November 2019.

Weisler has a bachelor's degree in computing from Monash University. He is married with two children, and lives in Palo Alto, California. Weisler is a pilot who owns and flies a Pilatus PC-12.

On November 1, 2019, Weisler stepped down as chief executive officer and president of HP Inc due to "a family health matter".

He is on the board of Intel.
