= Gabriel Escarrer =

Spanish billionaire businessman (1935–2024)

- Born: Gabriel Escarrer Julià; 2 March 1935; Porreres, Mallorca, Spain
- Died: 26 November 2024 (aged 89); Palma de Mallorca, Spain
- Occupation: Businessman
- Known for: Founder, Meliá Hotels International
- Children: 6, including Gabriel Escarrer Jaume

Gabriel Escarrer Julià (2 March 1935 – 26 November 2024) was a Spanish billionaire businessman, and the founder of Meliá Hotels International.

Gabriel Escarrer Julià was born on 2 March 1935 in Porreres, Mallorca.

He was the founder and chairman of Meliá Hotels International. In September 2024, he was awarded the Premio Empresario del Año (Entrepreneur of the Year) in the Premios Vanguardia.

He had six children, and lived in Mallorca, Spain. Escarrer died on 26 November 2024, at the age of 89, in Palma de Mallorca. His son Gabriel Escarrer Jaume is the chairman and CEO of Meliá.
