= Garcia d'Ávila Tower House =

Tower House of Garcia d'Avila
- Casa da Torre de Garcia d'Ávila
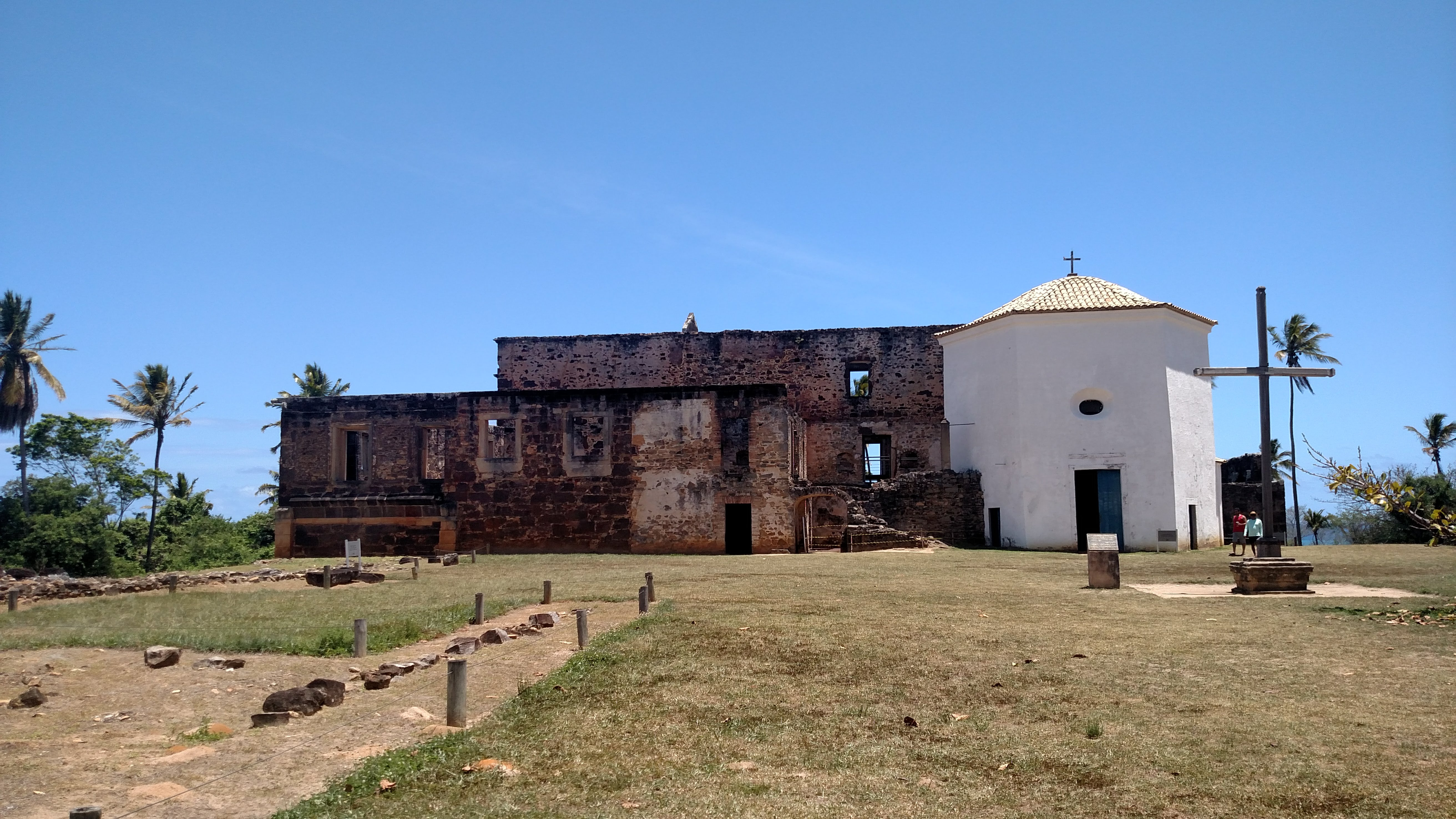

- Location within Brazil

General information
- Location: Mata de São João, Bahia, Brazil
- Coordinates: 12.579343°S 38.030148°W

National Historic Heritage of Brazil
- Designated: 1938
- Reference no.: 128

The Tower House of Garcia d'Avila (Portuguese: Casa da Torre de Garcia d'Ávila), also known as the Castelo de Garcia d'Ávila, Forte de Garcia d'Ávila, is a 17th-century building complex in Mata de São João, Bahia, Brazil. It was constructed in the present-day settlement of Praia do Forte, 1,200 metres (3,900 ft) from a small natural harbor on the Atlantic coast. Tomé de Sousa (1503–1579), the first governor-general of Brazil, appointed his son Garcia de Sousa d'Ávila (1528–1609) to build a fortress on the Bahia coast. The castle sits on a hill with a good view of the Atlantic Ocean; the castle, as well as the village of Tatuapara, served as an advanced point of vigilance for Salvador and settlements around the Bay of All Saints. Alerts of the approach of enemy ships were sent from the castle to Salvador via encrypted messages of smoke and torches; they traveled from the castle through a chain of Jesuit villages and other small settlements until they reached Salvador.

Garcia built a complex that included a fortified watchtower, a castle, and a church. The site is now in ruins.

== History ==
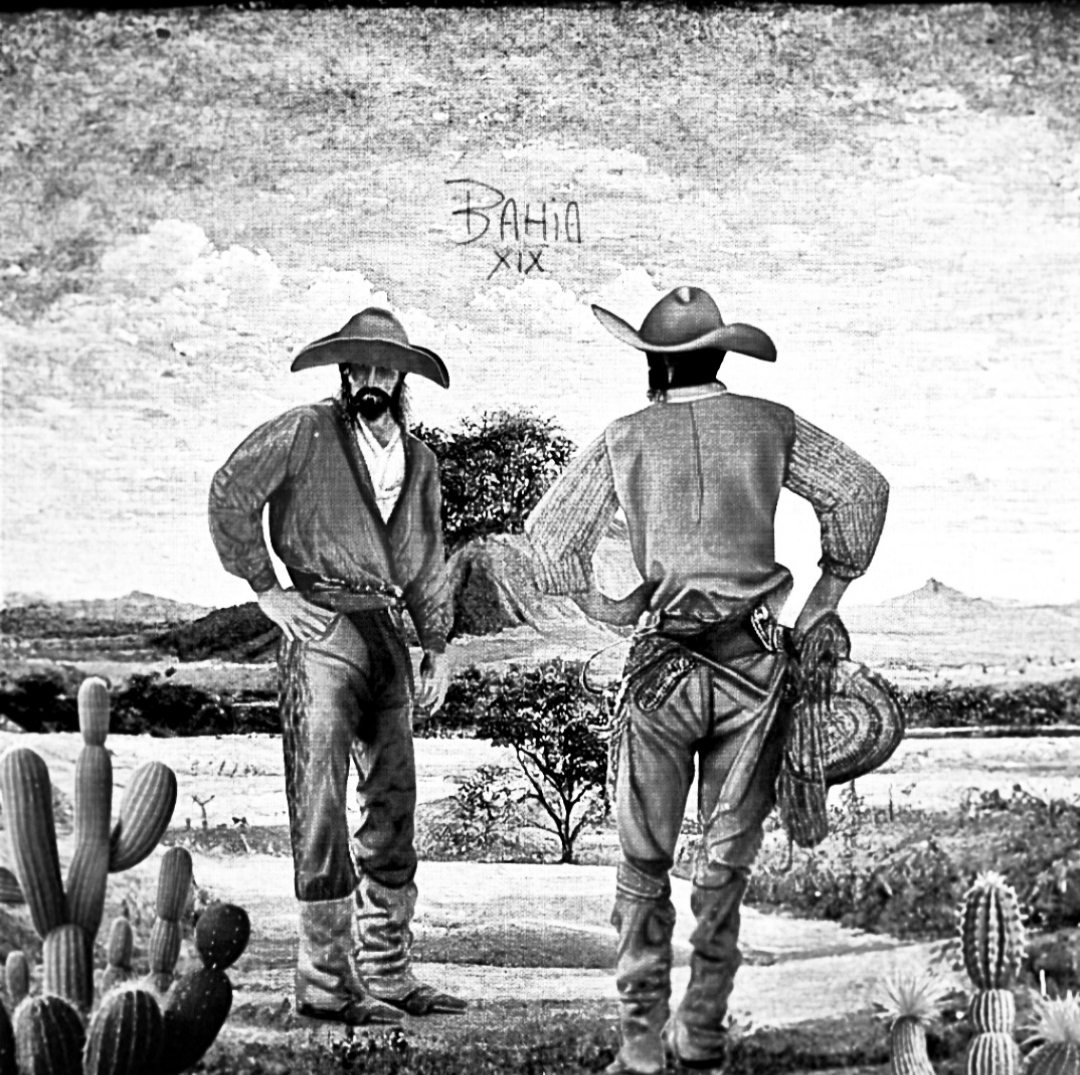
Vaqueiros from Bahia, 1810s.

This pioneering in the hinterland, starting from the tower house, gave rise to the figure of the vaqueiro, popularly known as "vaqueiro nordestino", it was through this pioneering taking livestock to the Bahian sertão, that vaqueiros began to look for leather as "armor" to deal with the cattle in the thorny forest.

Casa da Torre was the embryo of a great morgado that began in the captaincy of Bahia in the 16th century and that, for 250 years, expanded over the generations of its lords for more than 400 leagues in the Northeast region of Brazil — a territory that corresponded to twice the captaincy of Piauí — at the cost of wars against the Indians, with their enslavement to work in the sugar cane plantations, in the sugar mills and in the creation of oxen, horses and mules (all these animals were used for transport over short distances and as traction force on the mills). The expansion was also motivated by the search for silver mines, although only saltpeter mines were found. It constitutes the center of an expressive military power in the colonial period. From 1798 onwards, he was involved in the struggles for the Independence of Brazil. Many of its members were awarded titles of nobility by both Pedro I of Brazil and Pedro II of Brazil.

== Protected status ==
The Garcia d’Ávila Tower House and Chapel of Our Lady of the Conception were listed as a historic structure by the National Institute of Historic and Artistic Heritage in 1938.
