= Patricia Gras =

American journalist (born 1960)

- Patricia Wins 5th regional Emmy.
- Born: Patricia Elizabeth Gras; August 12, 1960 (age 65); Houston, Texas, US
- Occupations: News Anchor; Television Producer (1991 - present)
- Years active: 1988 - present
- Known for: Living Smart with Patricia Gras on Houston PBS (2003-Present)
- Height: 5 ft 7 in (1.70 m)
- Awards: 6 Regional Emmy

Patricia Elizabeth Gras (born August 12, 1960) is an American journalist, television anchor, and producer.

== Early life and education ==
Gras was born in Houston, Texas of Argentinian parents. In 1962, they moved back to Mendoza, Argentina, where she grew up. In 1972, she moved back to the United States with her parents. Resettled in Houston, she attended Saint Agnes Academy in 1979 and went on to get a bachelor's degree at Texas A&M University. She received master's degrees from the Thunderbird School of Global Management, from the ESADE in Barcelona, Spain and in 1990 in Journalism from Columbia University in New York City. While in Spain, Gras learned Catalan, her fifth spoken language besides Spanish, English, French, and Italian.

== Career ==
Before completely pursuing a career in television journalism she worked as a marketing executive for Ralston Purina in Spain and with Duquesne Purina in Paris as a market researcher. In 1987 she returned to Houston. Her first job in television was with Telemundo's Channel 48, which produced the first newscast in Spanish. In the early 1990s after graduation from Columbia University she began working for Houston Public Television. She worked for the Public Broadcasting Service in Houston, Texas, Channel 8, for 22 years. Her local talk show "Living Smart with Patricia Gras" aired on PBS channels. She also co-anchored Latina Voices: Smart Talk on Houston PBS, an English language, internet streamed talk show with a Latina perspective, until 2011. In 2012, she was a delegate for the Nobel Women's Initiative fact-finding mission on violence against women in Mexico led by Nobel Peace Laureate Jody Williams.

== Awards ==
Gras has been the recipient of over 170 journalism awards.

- Regional Emmy award: Houston PBS: EMMY Lone Star : Houston Refugees (producer) 2012
- Regional Emmy award: Non News Writing Fuel for Thought: High Gas Prices and How They Got That Way. (2009)
- Regional Emmy award: Producer, "Romania’s children: The Power of Love" (2005),
- EMMY Suncoast: “Heroes” (1997)
- EMMY Suncoast: “Romania’s children: Rescued by love” (1998)
- EMMY Suncoast: “Living with Hope” (2000)
- EMMY Suncoast: “Struggle makes you stronger.” (2000)
- Houston Citizens Chamber of Commerce, Earl B. Loggins Award, 2006
- Willy Velazquez Hispanic Excellence Award 2005
- North American Taiwanese Women's Association Community Award 2005
- Anson Jones Medical Award, for Living Smart, “The Art of Sleep”
- Bronze Telly Award-National, Struggle Makes You Stronger
- Bronze Telly Award-National, Angel in the Journey
- Bronze Telly Award-National, Living with Hope
- Francis C. Moore M.D. Medical Journalism Award, 2005
- National Mental Health Association's National Media Award 2000
- Barbara Jordan Media Award, 2001
- Barbara Jordan Media Award, 2004
- Houston Trial Lawyers Association Annual First Amendment Award, 2004

In 2008, Gras was voted one of the most influential women by Houston Woman Magazine.
