= Miquel Fluxà Rosselló =

Spanish billionaire businessman

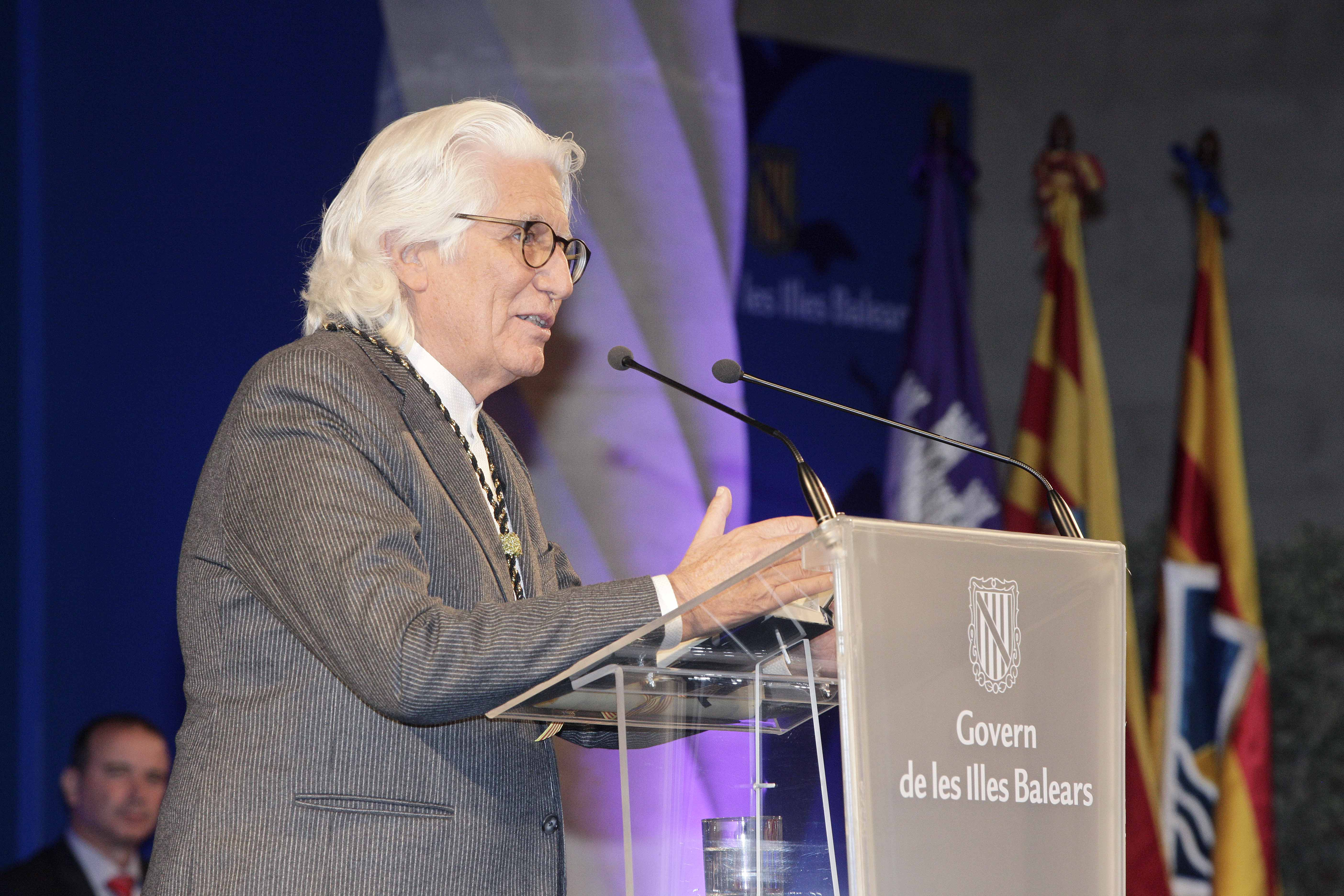
- Born: July 1938 (age 87); Majorca, Spain
- Known for: Chairman and owner of Grupo Iberostar
- Spouse: Sabina Thienemann
- Children: Sabina and Gloria
- Father: Llorenç Fluxà Figuerola

Miquel Fluxà Rosselló (born July 1938) is a Spanish billionaire businessman, and the chairman and 100% owner of Grupo Iberostar, which owns 100 hotels and resorts in 16 countries. Fluxà Rosselló is the "third generation heir to a shoe-making business". As of April 2022, his net worth is estimated at US 3.2 billion.

== Early life ==
Fluxà was born in Majorca in July 1938, he is the grandson of Antonio Fluxà who set up the shoe-making shop Lottusse in Majorca in 1877, and the son of Llorenç Fluxà Figuerola who expanded the family business to hospitality. Fluxà has two brothers: Antonio who led the family shoe company Lottusse until his death in 2015, and Lorenzo who founded the shoe brand Camper in 1975.

== Career ==
In 1986, with his father, Fluxà opened his first Iberostar hotel. Expansion of the group included the acquisitions of an airline company, a cruise company and hotel chains. After his father died in 1993, Fluxà led the opening of the group's first international location in the Dominican Republic.

In 2004, Fluxà founded Fundacion Iberostar. In 2006, he sold most of the group's tourism subsidiaries to focus on hotels.

In 2016, he appeared for the first time in Forbes' billionaire list with an estimated net worth of $2.1 billion.

== Personal life ==
Fluxà is married to Sabina Thienemann, and lives in Esporles, Spain. He has two daughters, Sabina and Gloria, both of whom work for the company.
