= Ángel Faus Belau =

Spanish journalist and academic (1936–2020)

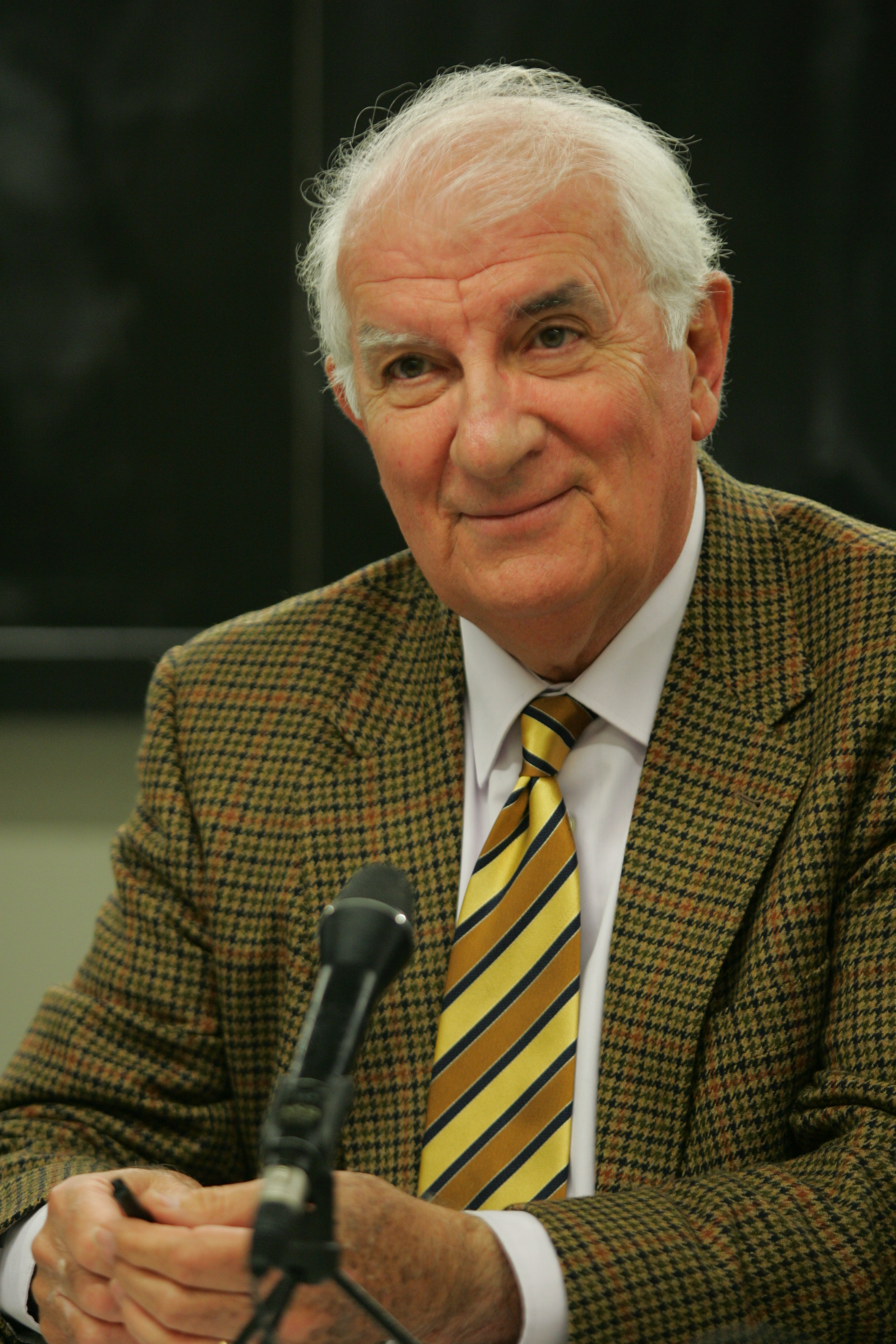
- Ángel Faus Belau in 2007
- Born: 9 February 1936; Villarreal, Valencian Community, Spain
- Died: 30 August 2020 (aged 84); Castellón de la Plana, Spain
- Education: University of Navarre
- Spouse: María Luis Alcaraz Castelló (?–2020; his death)
- Children: Five

Ángel Faus Belau (9 February 1936 – 30 August 2020) was a Spanish journalist and professor emeritus of communications at the University of Navarre. He was considered a leading expert on European radio broadcasting. In 1979, he became the first Spaniard to earn a doctorate in information sciences.

In his book, "La radio en España (1896-1977). Una historia documental", Faus argued that Julio Cervera Baviera, a Spanish engineer, was the actual inventor of the radio, rather than Guglielmo Marconi. Faus published more than 300 books, articles and scholarly journals during his career.

Ángel Faus Belau died in Castellón de la Plana on 30 August 2020, at the age of 84. He was survived by his wife, María Luis Alcaraz Castelló, and their five children - María Luisa, María Ángeles, Ángel, Begoña, and Luis Faus Alcaraz. His funeral was held at Castelló Cathedral in Castellón de la Plana on 31 August 2020.
