= Javier Ferrán =

Spanish businessman (born 1956)

- Born: Francisco Javier Ferrán Larraz; August 1956 (age 69)
- Education: University of Barcelona; ESADE; University of Miami
- Occupation: Businessman
- Title: Chairman, Diageo
- Term: January 2017-
- Predecessor: Franz Humer
- Board member of: Diageo; Lion Capital LLP; Associated British Foods; Agrolimen

Francisco Javier Ferrán Larraz (born August 1956) is a Spanish businessman. He was president and chief executive officer (CEO) of Bacardi from 2003 to 2004.

Ferrán has been the chairman of Diageo since January 2017, when Franz Humer retired. His Diageo tenure was renewed in 2023 for three further years and is set to expire in October 2025. Ferrán also chairs British Airways' parent company, International Consolidated Airlines Group.

== Early life and education ==
Ferrán was born in August 1956. He graduated from the University of Barcelona and received a BA and MBA from ESADE, in Barcelona. He later earned an MA in Computer Information Systems from the University of Miami in 1984.

== Career ==
From 1979 to 1984, he worked for Lloyds TSB, including two years as vice President of the Miami, Florida branch. He joined Martini & Rossi in 1985, where he later served as managing director. He joined Bacardi in 1992, and served as regional president for Europe, Middle East and Africa from 1994. He served as president and CEO from March 2003 to November 2004. During his time at Bacardi, he oversaw the acquisition of Grey Goose vodka.

Since 2019, he has served as an operating partner with BlackRock's private equity fund. He was previously a partner of the London-based private equity firm Lion Capital LLP from 2005 to 2019. He has been a director at SABMiller. He is also on the board of directors of Associated British Foods and Agrolimen.
