= Mata de São João =

Municipality of Bahia, Brazil

Mata de São João Município de Mata de São João
- Municipality
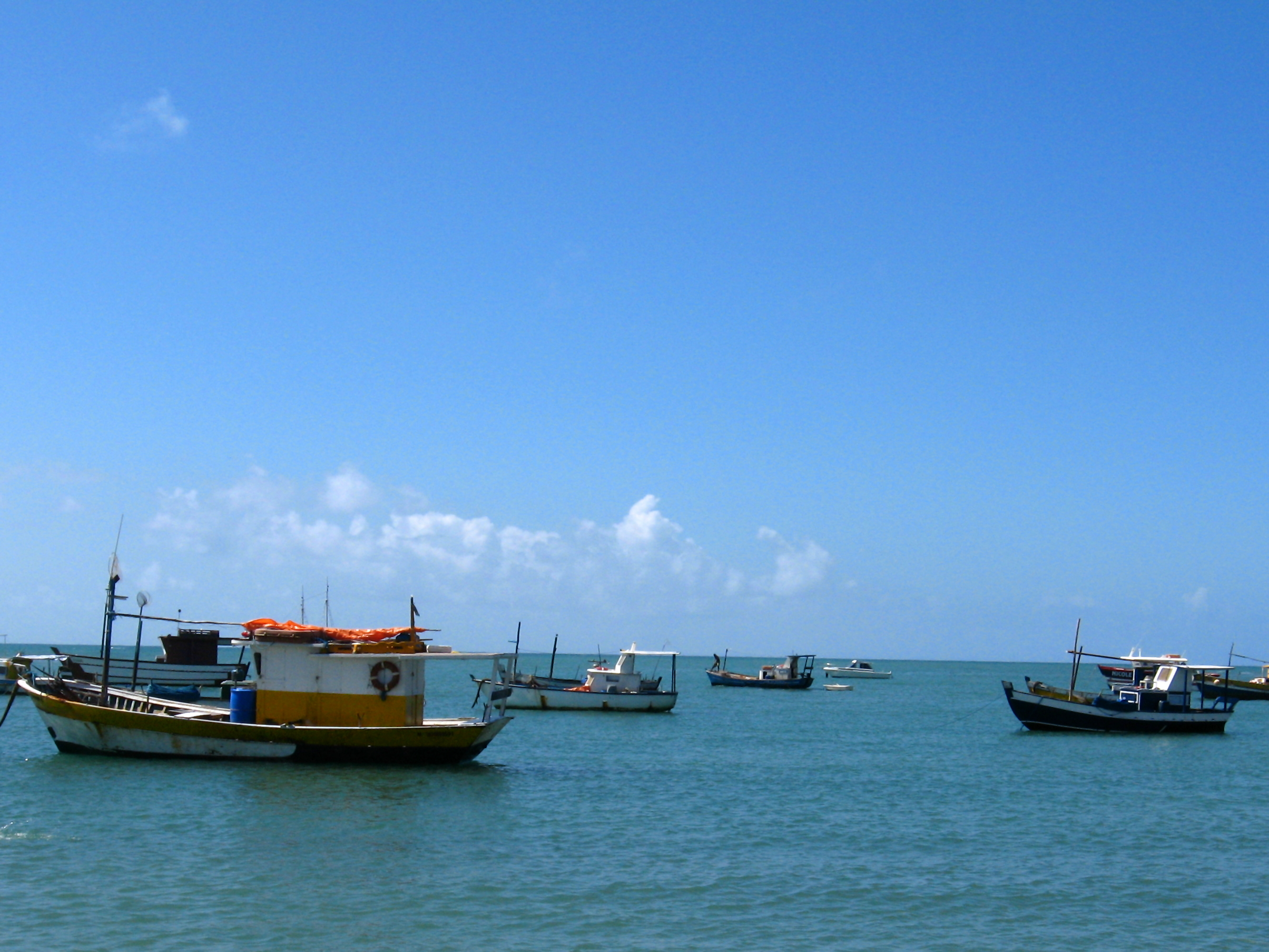
- Boats on the beaches of Mata de São João

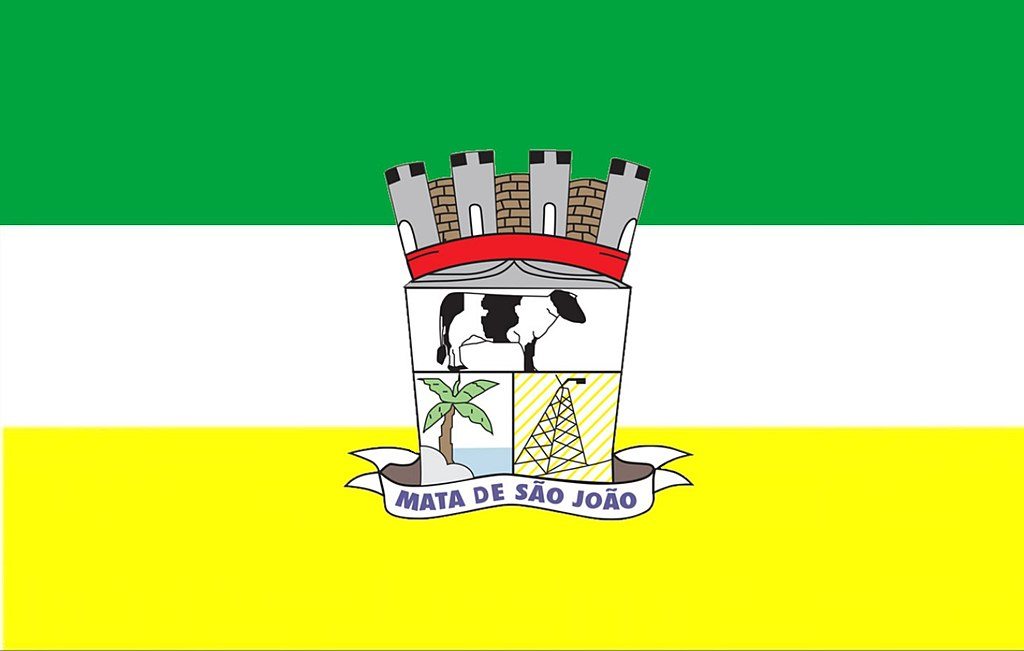
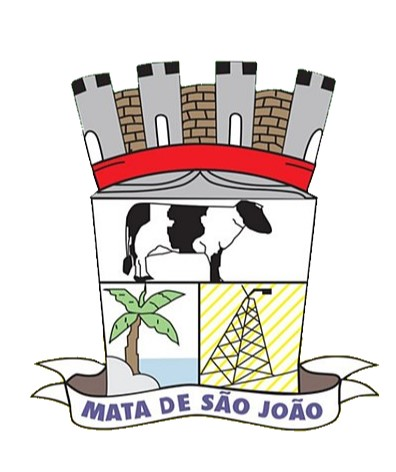
- Flag Coat of arms

- Location of Mata de São João in Bahia

- Location of Mata de São João in Brazil
- Coordinates: 12.5305°S 38.2996°W
- Country: Brazil
- Region: Northeast
- State: Bahia
- Founded: April 14, 1846

Government
  - Mayor: Marcelo Oliveira (2017–2020)

Area
  - Total: 605.17 km^{2} (233.66 sq mi)

Population (2020)
  - Total: 47,126
  - Density: 77.872/km^{2} (201.69/sq mi)
- Demonym: matense
- Time zone: UTC−3 (BRT)

Mata de São João is a municipality in the state of Bahia in the North-East region of Brazil. It covers 605.17 km^{2} (233.66 mi^{2}) and a population of 47,126 (2020 est.). Mata de São João has a population density of 73 inhabitants per square kilometer. It is located 56 km (35 mi) from the state capital of Bahia, Salvador.

== History ==
Mata de São João was settled by the Portuguese in 1549 with the arrival of Tomé de Souza in Brazil. De Souza appointed his son Garcia de Sousa d'Ávila (1528-1609) to build a fortress on the Bahia coast. De Sousa d'Ávila built the Garcia d'Ávila Tower House and Chapel of Our Lady of the Conception complex, which consisted of a fort, a castle, and a church. The castle is a unique example of medieval architectural in the Americas. The site is now in ruins.

De Sousa d'Ávila also became one of the largest land owners in the Americas; its holdings extended from Bahia to present-day Maranhão in the north. The Casa da Torre established numerous sugarcane plantations in the Bahia region and cattle ranches in Sergipe and the semi-arid sertão of São Francisco. The Casa da Torre was also a center of enslavement of native Brazilians and the importation of African slaves. The descendants of Tomé de Souza are also noted for their cruelty and torture of slaves at Mata de São João; their acts of barbarity are noted in the 18th-century records of the Portuguese Inquisition.

== Notable events ==
Mata de São João hosted Croatia national football team during their stay in Brazil at the 2014 FIFA World Cup.

== See also ==
- Sauipe, a district of Mata de São João
