= ESADE Law School =

Spanish college and graduate school

Coordinates: 41.39469°N 2.11508°E

Esade Law School
- Facultad de Derecho Esade
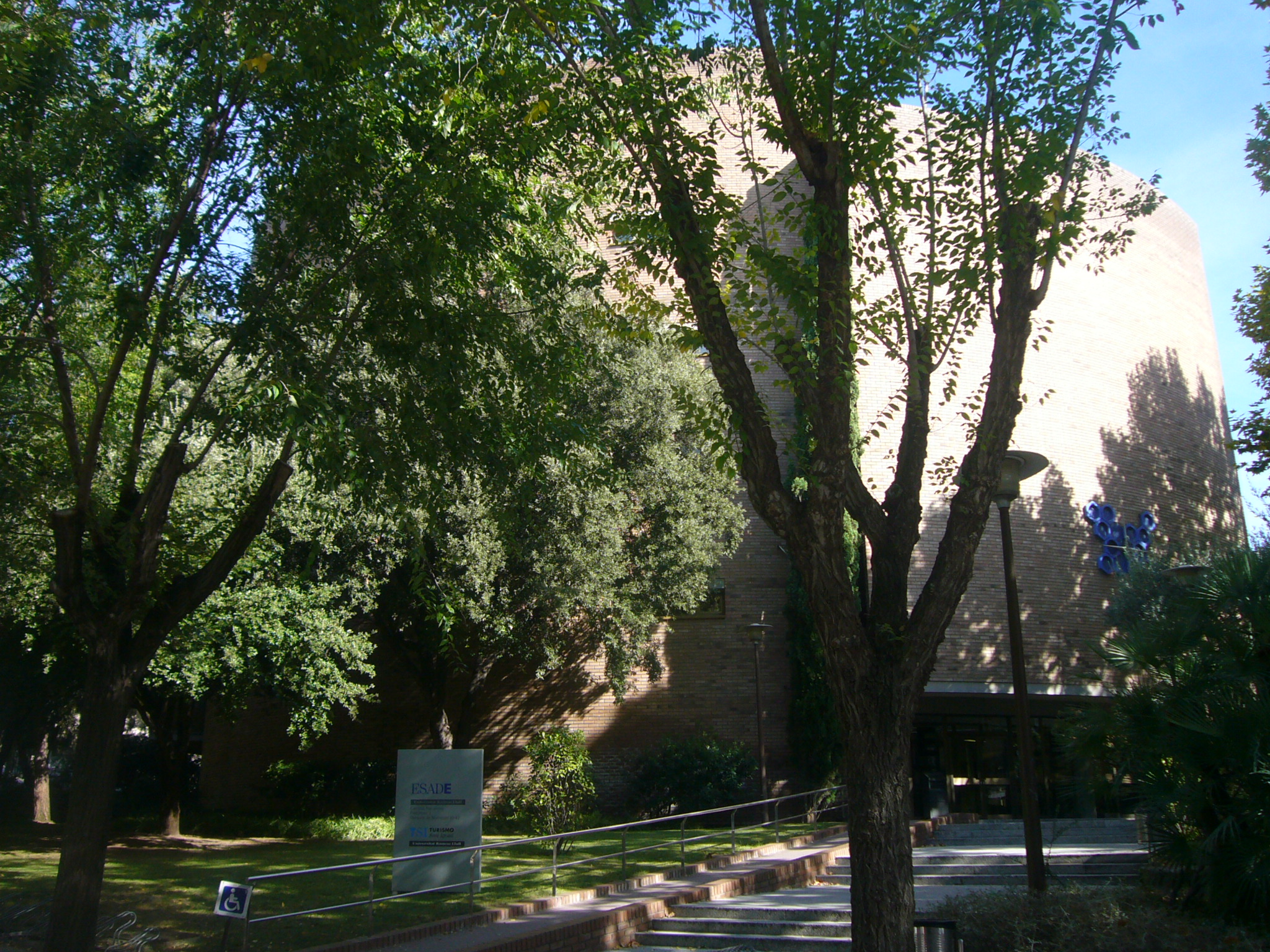
- Building 2, formerly used by the law school, and nowadays used by the Tourism school
- Motto: Do Good. Do Better.
- Type: Private Law School
- Established: 1992
- Parent institution: Ramon Llull University
- Location: Barcelona, Spain
- Affiliations: THEMIS Programme
- Website: www.esade.edu/en/faculty-research/faculties/law-school

Esade Law School is the law school of Ramon Llull University. It is run by the ESADE. It was created in 1992 in order to train legal professionals capable of coping with the challenges posed by globalisation. The law school is situated on the Esade campus in Barcelona and has offshoots in Madrid, Buenos Aires and Casablanca. Its motto is Do Good. Do Better., and is ranked among the world's top law school programs by the Financial Times, The Economist, Forbes, QS World University Rankings, and more.

Along with some of the best European universities, the Esade Law School created the European Joint Degree in Business Law (THEMIS Programme) and is the only faculty in Spain to offer students the opportunity to obtain this degree, furthermore, it is the only Law School in Spain to have a Professional Council made up of representatives from all legal professions and over 30 internationally renowned Law firms.

The law school has a high standing among law firms and scholars in Spain and its programs have been ranked 1st in Spain by the Spanish media in 2004, 2005 and 2006.

== See also ==
- List of Jesuit sites
