= Gabriel Escarrer Jaume =

Spanish businessperson

- Born: Gabriel Juan Escarrer Jaume; January 1971 (age 55)
- Education: University of Pennsylvania; ESADE
- Occupation: Businessman
- Title: CEO and vice-chairman, Meliá Hotels International
- Spouse: Married
- Children: 4
- Parent: Gabriel Escarrer Juliá

Gabriel Juan Escarrer Jaume (born January 1971) is a Spanish businessman, heir to Meliá Hotels International, where he is the CEO and Chairman.

== Early life ==
He is the son of the founder and chairman, Gabriel Escarrer Juliá.

Escarrer has a BS degree in economics from the Wharton School of the University of Pennsylvania, where he specialized in finance and business management. He has an MBA from ESADE.

== Career ==
Escarrer worked in New York City in finance with Salomon Smith Barney for three years, before joining Meliá Hotels. Escarrer and his family own almost 56% of Meliá Hotels.

== Personal life ==
Escarrer is married, with four children, and lives in Palma de Majorca, Spain.
