= Jaume Guardiola Romojaro =

Spanish banker (born 1957)

Jaume Guardiola
- Born: Jaume Guardiola i Romojaro; 1957 (age 68–69); Barcelona
- Education: University of Barcelona
- Occupations: banker & businessperson
- Known for: Banc Sabadell CEO (2007-2019)

Jaume Guardiola i Romojaro (Barcelona, 1957) is a Catalan businessperson, CEO of Banc Sabadell between 2007 and 2020. Since 2021 he Chairman of the ESADE Foundation and since 2022 is the President of the Cercle d'Economia.

== Biography ==
Guardiola has a degree in law from the University of Barcelona and a degree in Business Sciences and an MBA from ESADE.

During the 1980s he worked at Banco Bilbao, where he was deputy general manager (1985-1989) and general manager (1995-1990). Later, at BBVA, he held managerial responsibilities in Mexico and Puerto Rico in the 2000s, during the bank's international expansion to Latin America. In 2007 he joined Banc Sabadell as the new CEO. During his management, Sabadell grew and acquired other entities such as Banco Gallego and Caja de Ahorros del Mediterráneo.(CAM) In December 2020 he stepped down as CEO of Banc Sabadell, and in 2022 he was elected president of the Barcelona's think tank Cercle d'Economia. He is also Chairman of the ESADE Foundation.
