= Praia do Forte =

Praia do forte
- Municipality
- Município de Mata de São João; Municipality of Mata de São João
- Location in Brazil
- Coordinates: 12°58′29″S 38°28′36″W
- Country: Brazil
- Region: Northeast

Population (2014)
  - Total: 1,800
- Time zone: UTC-3

Praia do Forte is a long beach with a small village 80 km away from the city of Salvador, Bahia. The beach is known for its clear waters, white sand, natural pools, rivers and an ecological reserve of native flora and fauna.

== Climate ==
Praia do forte features a tropical rainforest climate (Köppen: Af) with no discernible dry season due to no month having an average rainfall of 60 mm. Temperatures are relatively constant throughout the course of the year, Praia do forte's driest month of the year is September, where the village receives on average 10 cm (4 in) of precipitation. Praia do forte's wettest months are between April and June when at least 20 cm (8 in) of rain falls during each of these four months. A distinctive feature of this place is that it stays sunny throughout the whole year, with the difference that in the months from May to July rainy season occurs. Because of this, activities and excursions in the area vary according to the season.

=== TAMAR project ===
The Projeto TAMAR (Portuguese for TAMAR Project, with TAMAR being an abbreviation of Tartarugas Marinhas, the Sea Turtles) is a Brazilian non-profit organization owned by the Chico Mendes Institute for Biodiversity Conservation.[1] The main objective of the project is to protect sea turtles from extinction in the Brazilian coastline. The Tamar Project station, designed to protect endangered sea turtles, is located on the beach of Praia do Forte next to the church and lighthouse.

== See also ==
- Garcia d'Ávila Tower House, a 17th-century building complex near the village
