= Enrique Lores =

Spanish American businessperson and board member, CEO of HP Inc.

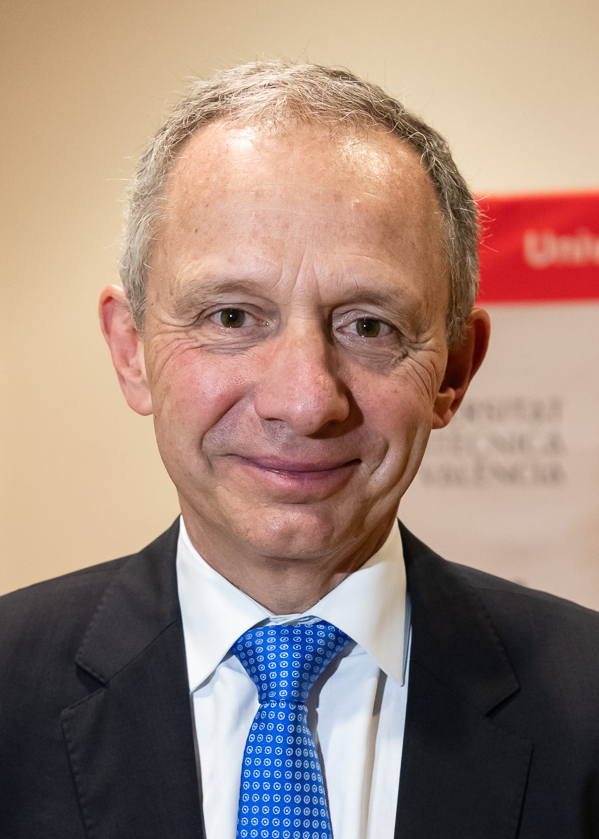
- Lores in 2024
- Born: 1964 or 1965 (age 61–62)
- Education: Polytechnic University of Valencia (BEE); ESADE (MBA)
- Occupation: Businessman
- Title: Incoming CEO at PayPal, Former CEO at HP Inc.
- Term: November 2019-
- Predecessor: Alex Chriss, Dion Weisler

Enrique José Lores Obradors (born 1965) is a Spanish-American business executive. He served as the CEO of HP Inc. between November 2019 and February 2026. In February 2026, Lores was announced as CEO of PayPal.

Lores was born in Madrid. He earned a bachelor's degree in electrical engineering from the Polytechnic University of Valencia, and an MBA from ESADE Business School in Barcelona.

Lores began his career at Hewlett-Packard in 1989, joining the company as an engineering intern shortly after graduating with a degree in electrical engineering from the Polytechnic University of Valencia and later earning an MBA from ESADE Business School. Over the next three decades, he held senior leadership roles across HP’s global operations, working in its Personal Systems, Print, Industrial, and Services businesses at the regional and worldwide level.

Throughout his tenure, Lores was involved in several pivotal phases of the company’s evolution. He served in senior positions including general manager of HP’s commercial PC business, senior vice president of worldwide customer support and services, and senior vice president of worldwide sales and solutions. He also led the Separation Management Office, playing a key role in the complex split of Hewlett-Packard into Hewlett Packard Enterprise and HP Inc. in 2015, and oversaw strategic initiatives such as the acquisition of Samsung’s printer business.

Prior to becoming CEO, Lores was President of HP’s Imaging, Printing and Solutions business, where he oversaw the company’s largest product segment and helped steer growth and innovation in printing technologies.

In August 2019, HP’s board of directors unanimously appointed Lores as President and CEO, succeeding Dion Weisler, with his appointment becoming effective on November 1, 2019. As CEO, Lores focused on positioning HP for future growth through a strategy emphasizing portfolio expansion, digital transformation, and talent development.

Under his leadership, HP navigated significant industry challenges and shifts in the computing and printing markets, maintaining its position as a major global technology company. Lores’s tenure ended in early 2026 when he stepped down to take on the role of CEO at PayPal.
