= Javier Faus =

Spanish businessman (born 1964)

Javier Faus Santasusana
- Born: 23 August 1964 (age 62); Barcelona, Catalonia, Spain
- Education: ESADE; UAB; Georgetown University
- Occupations: Entrepreneur, investor
- Known for: Founder of Meridian Capital Partners
- Title: Chairman and CEO of Meridian Capital Partners

Javier Faus (Barcelona, 1964) is a Spanish private equity investor, founder and chairman of the Barcelona-based alternative investment fund management firm Meridia Capital Partners. Active in civic associations, he served as Vice Chairman of FC Barcelona from 2010 to 2015. From July 2019 until July 2022, he served as chair of the Cercle d'Economia, a Spanish think tank that promotes liberal democratic public policies.

== Education ==
Faus has a law degree from Universidad Autónoma de Barcelona, a master's degree in International Law from Georgetown University (Washington, D.C.) and an Executive MBA from ESADE Business School (Barcelona).

== Career ==
Prior to his investment career, Faus worked as a mergers and acquisitions lawyer in the New York City office of J&A Garrigues and the Barcelona office of Cuatrecasas Abogados.

In 2001, he led a consortium to acquire HOVISA, the real estate company that owned Hotel Arts in Barcelona, managed by Ritz-Carlton, amongst other assets. He subsequently became president and minority shareholder of the company. Faus managed the sale in 2006 of HOVISA to a joint venture formed by Host Hotels & Resorts and GIC (Government of Singapore). This deal was for 417 million euro, at the time the highest price ever paid for a single real estate asset in Spain.

Between 2003 and 2006, Faus was managing partner for Spain and Portugal at Patron Capital Partners, a London-based real estate fund manager.

In 2006, Faus founded Meridia Capital Partners, an investment management firm, also known as Meridia, specializing in private equity and real estate. Its first fund, launched in 2007, focused on hotel investments. In 2016, Faus expanded his investment activities into private equity through Meridia Capital. The firm subsequently launched further real estate investment funds, including Meridia V in 2023 and Meridia VI in 2026.

Since 2019, Meridia has served as exclusive advisor in Spain and Portugal for Franklin Templeton's pan-European Social Infrastructure Fund, a fund seeking financial returns while delivering a measurable social and environmental impact.

=== FC Barcelona ===
Faus joined the management board of FC Barcelona, led by Joan Laporta, in 2003. In June 2005, Faus resigned following the departures of four other board members earlier that month, Sandro Rosell, Josep Maria Bartomeu, Jordi Moix, and Jordi Monés.

Following Sandro Rosell's election as president of FC Barcelona in 2010, Faus was appointed economic and strategic vice president of the management board. In June 2011, Faus announced budget cuts to the club's other sports sections and the discontinuation of the baseball section, citing financial sustainability concerns. The measures drew criticism.

Faus publicly supported FC Barcelona's sponsorship agreement with Qatar Foundation, which introduced commercial advertising on the team shirts for the first time, alongside the UNICEF logo. He defended the agreement by citing the club's financial situation. In November 2012, Faus announced that for the forthcoming season, the shirt sponsor would be modified from the Qatar Foundation to Qatar Airways in application of one of the clauses of the initial contract.

Following the reorganization of the board by the new president Josep Maria Bartomeu, Faus became the first vice president of the club in February 2014.

=== Other business and institutional roles ===
Faus has won several awards, including the 2002 Deal of the Year by International Hotel Investment Forum and the SAHIC 2011 Award for Best Investor. Faus is also an active angel investor in the Spanish start-up arena, having invested in companies such as Cocunat, Colvin Co, AGORA Images and WorldCoo under the umbrella of Mnext Venture Capital.

Between 2010 and 2014, he was a member of the board of directors at Inmobiliaria Colonial, one of the leading public Spanish real estate companies. In May 2016, Faus resigned from his position in the board of Colonial, to avoid potential conflicts of interest arising from his other professional activities. In 2016, he became a member of the board of directors of Indukern, a leading Spanish pharmaceutical company.

Faus was elected president of the Cercle d'Economia, a forum for businesspeople and economists, on July 24, 2019. As the only candidate, he was proclaimed president with 423 favorable votes, 1 vote against, and one abstention. Faus announced the creation of an advisory council that would be led by the outgoing president, Juan José Brugera, and two former presidents: the professor of the University of Barcelona, Anton Costas and the former minister of the People's Party, Josep Piqué. He also made public that the new management board would be equally gendered: 10 men and 10 women of renowned prestige.

Faus remained president of the Cercle d'Economia until 2022. That year, Faus served on the jury for the second Cercle d'Economia Award for European Integration, which was presented to European Commission President Ursula von der Leyen.

In the academic sphere, Faus is a member of the ESADE Alumni executive board and has collaborated with various professors at Harvard, IESE, and ESADE Business Schools.

== Controversies ==
Faus cited personal and professional reasons for his resignation from FC Barcelona's board in 2005, although his departure was also linked to disagreements with Laporta and his exclusion from sponsorship negotiations with the Chinese government.

In December 2013, Faus questioned the need to renegotiate Leo Messi's contract, arguing that it had been improved the previous year. Messi responded by criticizing Faus's understanding of football and denying that he had requested a new contract. In January 2014, Faus clarified his remarks, stating that they had not been made in bad faith.

In September 2014, Faus testified in legal proceedings concerning a liability claim brought by FC Barcelona against the former board led by Joan Laporta. The claim was dismissed at first instance in October 2014.

In November 2014, former FC Barcelona presidential candidate, Agustí Benedito, stated that Faus had personal interests in Qatar while serving on FC Barcelona's board. Javier Faus filed a lawsuit against Benedito, alleging damage to his reputation, but the case was dismissed in 2016.
