= Iberostar Group =

Hotel Chain

- Type: Private
- Industry: Hospitality and Travel
- Founded: 1956
- Headquarters: Palma, Majorca, Spain
- Key people: Miguel Fluxà Rosselló (owner and chairman); Sabina Fluxà (CEO)
- Products: Hotels
- Revenue: 5,100,000,000 (2025)
- Number of employees: + 28,000
- Parent: InterContinental Hotels Group
- Subsidiaries: World2Fly
- Website: www.grupoiberostar.com

Iberostar Group is a global tourism company and hotel group, part of IHG Hotels & Resorts. The company has four areas of business: the hotel division, the core business of the company; the holiday club, called The Club; World 2 Meet (W2M) and Iberoservice; and the property business. The company's trademark is "first line" hotels (meaning directly on the beach), surrounded by gardens. There are more than 120 Iberostar hotels worldwide.

== History ==
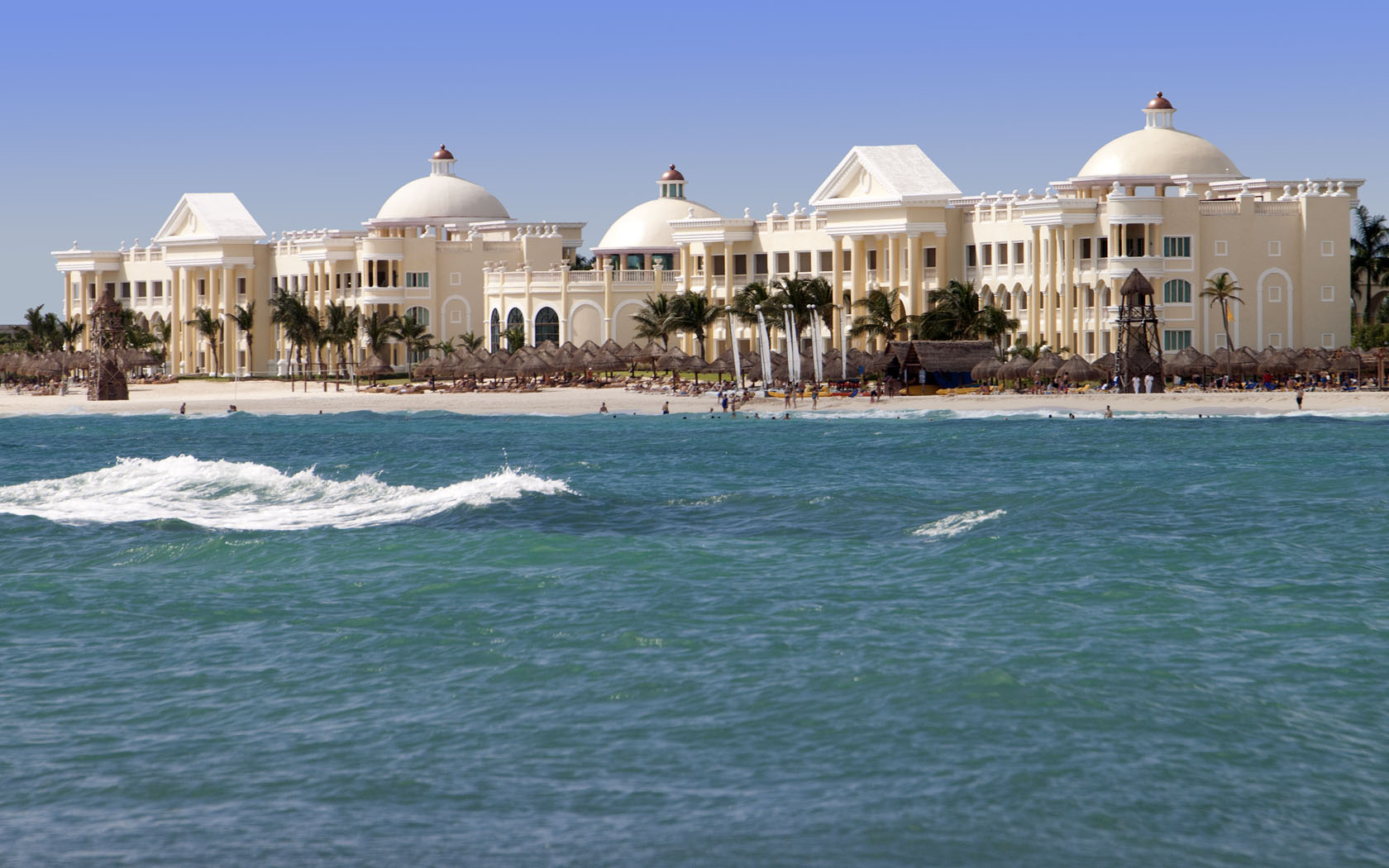
JOIA Paraíso by Iberostar, Riviera Maya, Mexico

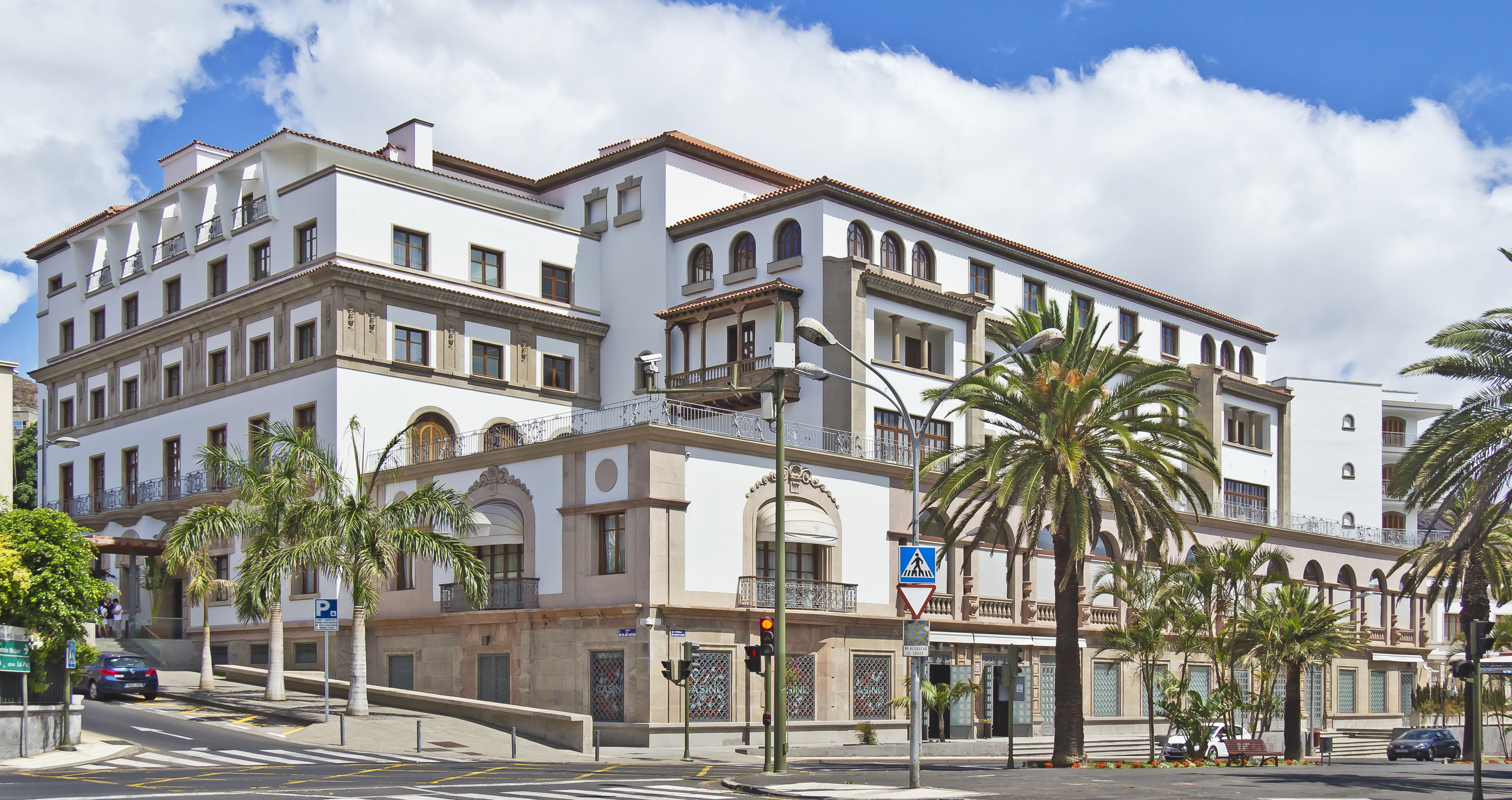
Iberostar Grand Hotel Mencey, Santa Cruz de Tenerife, Spain

Iberostar Group is owned by Spanish Miguel Fluxà Rosselló, the third generation heir to a shoe-making business.

Iberostar's head office is in Mallorca, Spain, and hotels that operate under their brand name are located in the continents of Europe, North America, Latin America and Africa.

The company temporarily closed the Rose Hall Beach Hotel (but not the adjoining Rose Hall Suites Hotel or Rose Hall Grand Hotel), one of its resorts in Jamaica. It reopened in May 2010.

Travel Trade Gazette, a UK-based travel industry publication, named the company "Best Hotel Chain of the Year" in 2009.

In 2004, the Iberostar Group purchased a large area of land in Praia do Forte in the municipality of Mata de São João in Bahia, state of Brazil, to build a resort. In 2006, Iberostar Bahia was inaugurated, which quickly fell in favor of Brazilian and South American tourists, in particular Argentine tourists, frequent visitors to the resort since then. 2 years later in 2008 the second resort was opened in the same place, Iberostar Praia do Forte, which recently came to be called Iberostar Selection. In the region, the Iberostar Group engaged in several social and environmental projects, they signed a partnership with the TAMAR Project and help in the preservation of sea turtles, they also built an educational center for children in partnership with UNICEF, which was named Dom Miguel Fluxá Rosselló.

In April 2010, Iberostar announced that the actor Antonio Banderas would be the new face of a global campaign to promote the company's hotels and resorts.

Iberostar has received negative press related to resorts in Mexico suspected of drugging tourists. There have been... "numerous reports from others who have told the Milwaukee Journal Sentinel they experienced sickness, blackouts and injuries after drinking at Iberostar, and other resorts around Cancun and Playa del Carmen in recent months.". Iberostar's resort location in Playa del Carmen was also cited in other reports, by the Journal Sentinel and CBS News, regarding TripAdvisor and its controversial review guidelines. Red-flag reviews of two women staying at the resort in 2010 and 2015, who were allegedly raped, one by a security guard who worked for the resort, were taken down by the travel website.

In 2019, the group sold the inbound tourism and travel brands Almundo for over €69million.

In 2022, Iberostar entered into a strategic alliance with IHG Hotels & Resorts, placing up to 70 beachside properties into the IHG system but retaining ownership.
