= Sabina Fluxà =

Spanish businesswoman

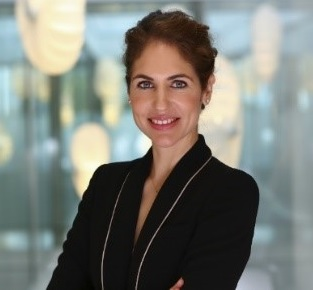
- Born: April 1980 (age 45)
- Education: ESADE Business School (BA, MBA)
- Occupation: Businessperson
- Title: Vice-chairman and CEO, Iberostar Hotels & Resorts
- Spouse: Alfonso Fierro
- Father: Miguel Fluxà Rosselló
- Relatives: Gloria Fluxà (sister); Llorenç Fluxà Figuerola (grandfather)

Sabina Fluxà Thienemann (born April 1980) is a Spanish businessperson, and the vice-chairman and CEO of Iberostar Hotels & Resorts.

== Early life and education ==
Sabina Fluxà was born in April 1980, the eldest daughter of Miguel Fluxà Rosselló, the billionaire chairman and 100% owner of Iberostar Hotels & Resorts, and his wife, Sabina Thienemann. Her younger sister, Gloria Fluxà, is the vice-chairman of Iberostar

Fluxà earned a bachelor's degree and MBA from ESADE Business School.

== Career ==
In January 2005, she joined Iberostar, a company founded by her father.

In 2017, Fluxà was included in a list of the top 100 women leaders in Spain.

As of 2017, Fluxà is a member of the regional advisory board of BBVA, a member of the governing Board of APD Illes Balears and patron of the Fundacion Iberostar, the Endeavor Foundation, and the ACS Foundation.

== Personal life ==
In 2012, she married Alfonso Fierro in Mallorca. The wedding banquet took place at Son Antich farm in Esporles, and the wedding was a huge social event.
