= Meliá Hotels International =

Spanish hotel chain

Meliá Hotels International, S.A.
- Type: Public (Sociedad Anónima)
- Traded as: BMAD: MEL; WBAG: MEL; OTCID Basic Limited: SMIZF; FWB: MEL; IBEX 35 component
- ISIN: ES0176252718
- Industry: Travel, tourism
- Founded: 1956
- Founder: José Meliá Sinisterra
- Headquarters: Palma de Mallorca, Spain
- Key people: Gabriel Escarrer Juliá (chairman); Gabriel Escarrer Jaume (CEO)
- Products: Hotels and resorts
- Revenue: €1.251 billion (2010)
- Operating income: €141.8 million (2010)
- Net income: €50.1 million (2010)
- Total assets: €3.390 billion (end 2010)
- Total equity: €1.116 billion (end 2010)
- Number of employees: 40000 (average, 2010)
- Website: www.melia.com

Meliá Hotels International, S.A. (formerly Sol Meliá) is a Spanish hotel chain. Sol was founded by Gabriel Escarrer Juliá in 1956 in Palma de Mallorca and Meliá was founded by José Meliá Sinisterra (1911–1999). It is also known as and referred to by its former name of Sol Meliá. The company is one of Spain's largest domestic operators of holiday resorts and the 17th biggest hotel chain worldwide. Domestically in Spain the company is the market leader in both resort and urban hotels. In December 2013 the hotel chain operated 374 hotels in 40 countries on 4 continents under the brands Meliá, Gran Meliá, ME by Meliá, Paradisus, Innside by Meliá, TRYP by Wyndham, Sol Hotels and Club Meliá.

== History ==
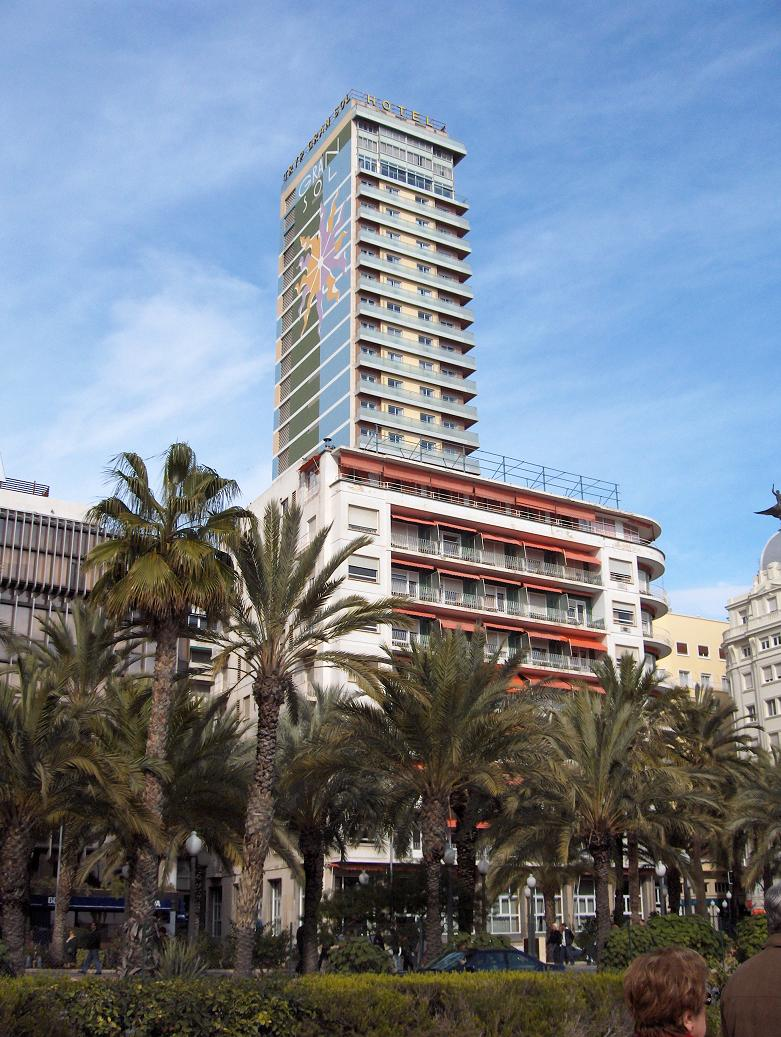
Hotel Alicante Gran Sol in Alicante

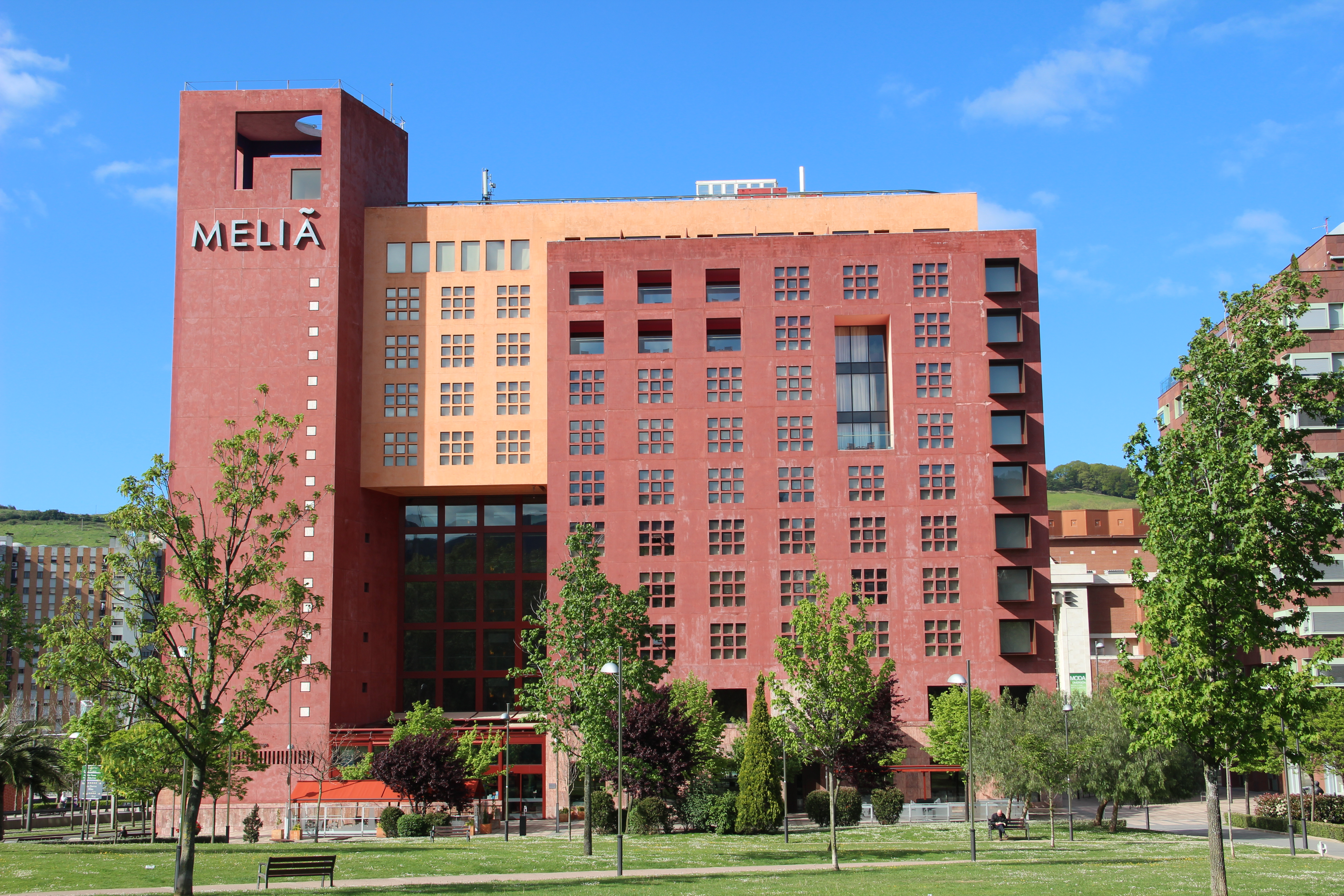
Meliá in Bilbao

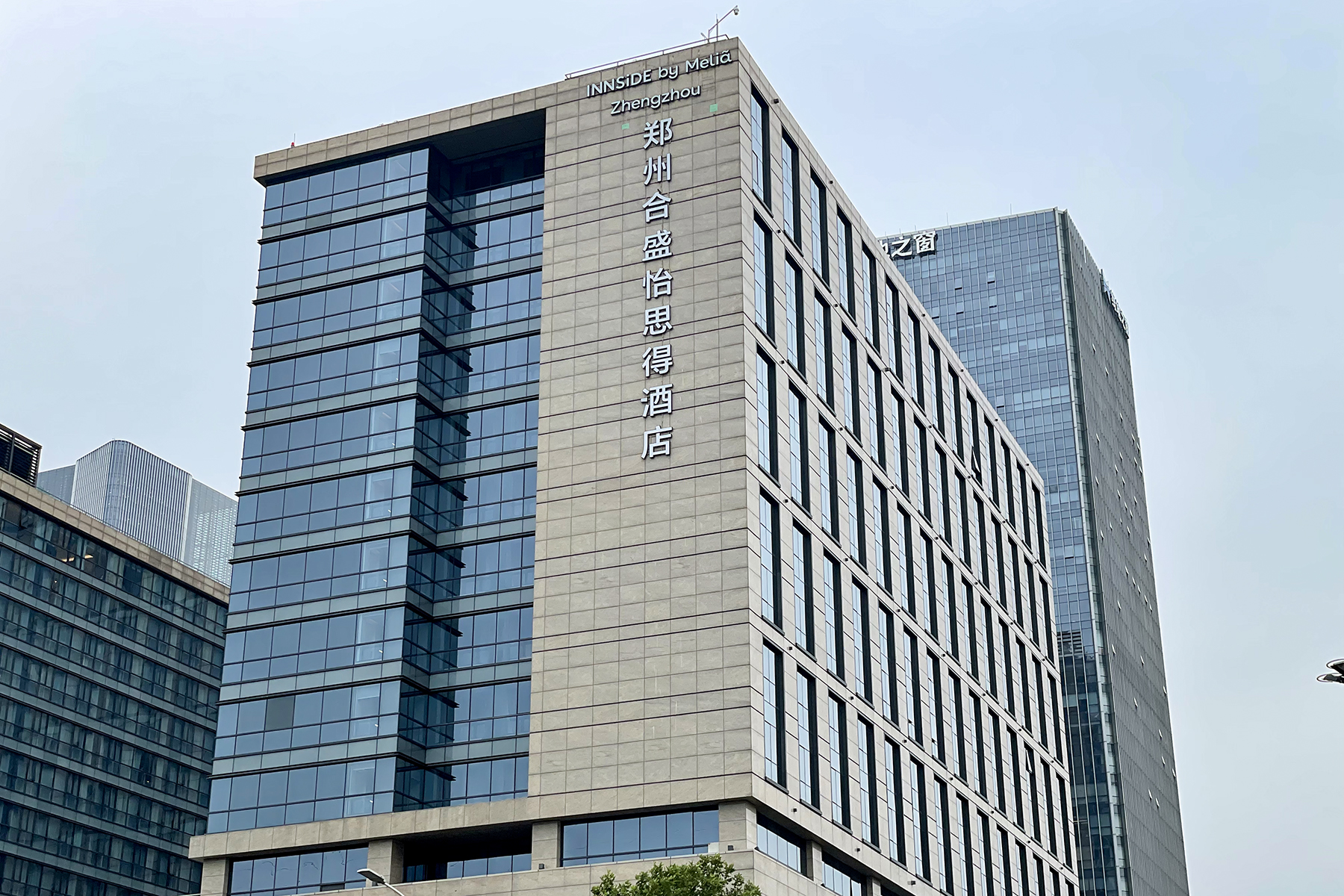
Innside by Meliá in Zhengzhou

=== Foundation and early years ===
The origins of the company reach back to 1956, when the then-21-year-old Gabriel Escarrer Juliá leased the Altair Hotel in Palma, Mallorca. Over the subsequent years Escarrer took advantage of the island's increasing popularity as a tourist destination for package holidaymakers, adding further properties to the portfolio of his company, Hoteles Mallorquines. The company expanded geographically in the 1960s and 70s, acquiring hotels in the Canaries as well as the other Balearic Islands. After the transition to democracy in Spain, tourism in Spain developed more rapidly and Hoteles Mallorquines aggressively moved onto the Spanish mainland, establishing a presence in much of the country by the early 1980s.

In 1984 the company renamed itself Hoteles Sol (English: Sun Hotels), before establishing itself as the largest hotel chain in the country with the acquisition of the 32 location-strong Hotasa group. Another merger followed three years later as the company combined with the upmarket Meliá chain, founded by Josep Melià i Sinisterra, to form Sol Meliá. The deal increased the geographical scope of the company into the Caribbean, Americas and other parts of Europe.

A 1996 split of the company into two separate businesses, one for hotel ownership (Inmotel) and another for management (Sol Meliá, which listed on the Bolsa de Madrid), was reversed three years later amid major consolidation in the industry. Gabriel Escarrer Sr. subsequently stepped down from the chief executive role, replaced by his sons Gabriel Jr. and Sebastian, who became deputy CEO. The following year brief takeover talks were held with Hilton International, but Sol Meliá instead chose to make an acquisition of its own, paying €360 million for smaller peer Tryp Hotels. Tryp had come close to being purchased by rival chain NH Hoteles a year earlier. Tryp continued to exist as a separate brand within the Sol Meliá group.

=== Development since 2010 ===
Rights to the Tryp brand were sold to Wyndham Worldwide in 2010, but Meliá continues to own and operate the hotels under a licensing agreement. On 3 June 2011 the company changed its name to Meliá Hotels International.

Meliá Hotels received strong criticism because of hosting a tribute to the caudillo Francisco Franco in 2015. More than 62,000 people signed against this, but the hotel decided to keep the tribute anyway. Also, the hotel board rejected to meet the representative of the association "Foro por la Memoria de la Comunidad de Madrid", representing signatories.

The company later sought to forge partnerships with other companies in the leisure industry, opening hotels based on the Hard Rock Cafe concept in conjunction with then-parent The Rank Group (joint venture dissolved in 2007), and Flintstones-themed hotels with Warner Bros.

Although publicly traded since 1996, the Escarrer family continues to control Meliá Hotels, holding a combined stake of over 63% at the end of 2010.

In June 2017, Meliá Hotels International confirmed Spanish badminton player, Carolina Marín as their new brand ambassador.

Meliá Hotels withdrew from Cuba in 2026 due to the tightening of the U.S. embargo.

== Operations ==
The company employs various commercial brands to offer their product, including Gran Meliá Hotels & Resorts, The Meliá Collection, ME by Meliá, Paradisus by Meliá, Meliá Hotels & Resorts, Zel, INNSiDE by Meliá, Sol by Meliá, Affiliated by Meliá and Club Meliá (formerly known as Sol Meliá Vacation Club). In 2010, they divested themselves of their Tryp Hotels brand when it was sold to Wyndham Hotels.

The firm operates more than 350 hotels as of November 2023, of which over 160 are in Spain. Of the other countries in which Meliá Hotels International operates, the largest numbers of hotels are located in Cuba, Germany, Croatia, Brazil and Portugal.

== Trademark dispute ==
In late 2008, Hotel Meliá, a century-old family-owned hotel in Ponce, Puerto Rico, filed a complaint against Sol Meliá in the Court of First Instance after he attempted to register the name "Meliá" with the Puerto Rico Department of State asserting that Hotel Meliá Inc. "had the sole right to use the Meliá mark in connection with hotel and restaurant services throughout Puerto Rico." As a result, Sol Meliá withdrew its application. But S.L. Dorpan, a wholly owned subsidiary of Sol Meliá, subsequently filed a complaint against the hotel in the United States District Court for the District of Puerto Rico, "seeking a declaration that under the Lanham Act, Dorpan had the right to use the mark Meliá throughout Puerto Rico" and that the hotel had the right to use the name Meliá only in the city of Ponce. The District Court issued an opinion on 31 March 2012 ruling in favor of Sol Meliá. Hotel Meliá then appealed the decision of the district court to the First Circuit Court of Appeals in Boston. On 28 August 2013, the Court of Appeals issued its opinion vacating the lower district court's decision and ruling in favor of Ponce's local Hotel Meliá.
