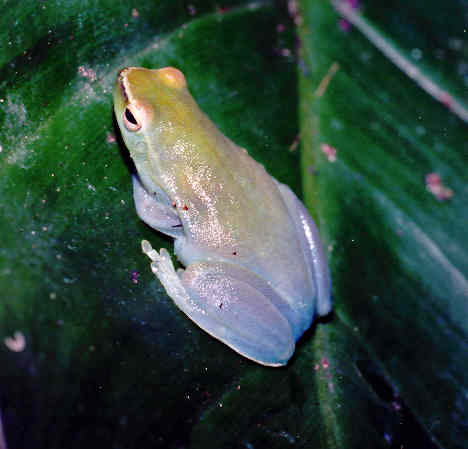
- Sphaenorhynchus lacteus

Scientific classification
- Kingdom: Animalia
- Phylum: Chordata
- Class: Amphibia
- Order: Anura
- Family: Hylidae
- Tribe: Dendropsophini
- Genus: Sphaenorhynchus; Tschudi, 1838

Species
- See text.

Synonyms
- Dryomelictes Fitzinger, 1843; Dryomelictes Cope, 1865; Hylopsis Werner, 1894; Sphoenohyla Lutz and Lutz, 1938

= Sphaenorhynchus =

Genus of amphibians

Sphaenorhynchus is a genus of frogs in the family Hylidae. They are also known as lime treefrogs or hatchet-faced treefrogs. They are found in the Amazon and Orinoco River basins of South America, the Guianas, Trinidad, and southern and eastern Brazil. The majority of the species are associated with the Atlantic Forest domain in Brazil.

== Systematics ==
Sphaenorhynchus has been suggested to be the sister taxon of the clade Scarthyla + Scinax. Faivovich and colleagues (2005) placed it in the tribe Dendropsophini, together with Dendropsophus, Lysapsus, Pseudis, Scarthyla, Scinax, and Xenohyla.

== Description ==
Sphaenorhynchus are small to moderately sized frogs. They are bright green or yellowish green in life. The snout is pointed and projecting in lateral view. Most species have well-developed horizontal dermal flaps on each side of the anus. The fingers are weakly webbed while the toes are extensively webbed. Males have a vocal sac on the posterior throat region.

== Species ==
The following species are recognised in the genus Sphaenorhynchus:

- Sphaenorhynchus botocudo (Caramaschi, Almeida, and Gasparini, 2009)
- Sphaenorhynchus bromelicola (Bokermann, 1966)
- Sphaenorhynchus cammaeus (Roberto, Araujo-Vieira, Carvalho-e-Silva, and Ávila, 2017)
- Sphaenorhynchus canga (Araujo-Vieira, Lacerda, Pezzuti, Leite, Assis, and Cruz, 2015)
- Sphaenorhynchus caramaschii (Toledo, Garcia, Lingnau, and Haddad, 2007)
- Sphaenorhynchus carneus (Cope, 1868)
- Sphaenorhynchus dorisae (Goin, 1957)
- Sphaenorhynchus lacteus (Daudin, 1800)
- Sphaenorhynchus mirim (Caramaschi, Almeida, and Gasparini, 2009)
- Sphaenorhynchus palustris (Bokermann, 1966)
- Sphaenorhynchus pauloalvini (Bokermann, 1973)
- Sphaenorhynchus planicola (Lutz and Lutz, 1938)
- Sphaenorhynchus platycephalus (Werner, 1894)
- Sphaenorhynchus prasinus (Bokermann, 1973)
- Sphaenorhynchus surdus (Cochran, 1953)
