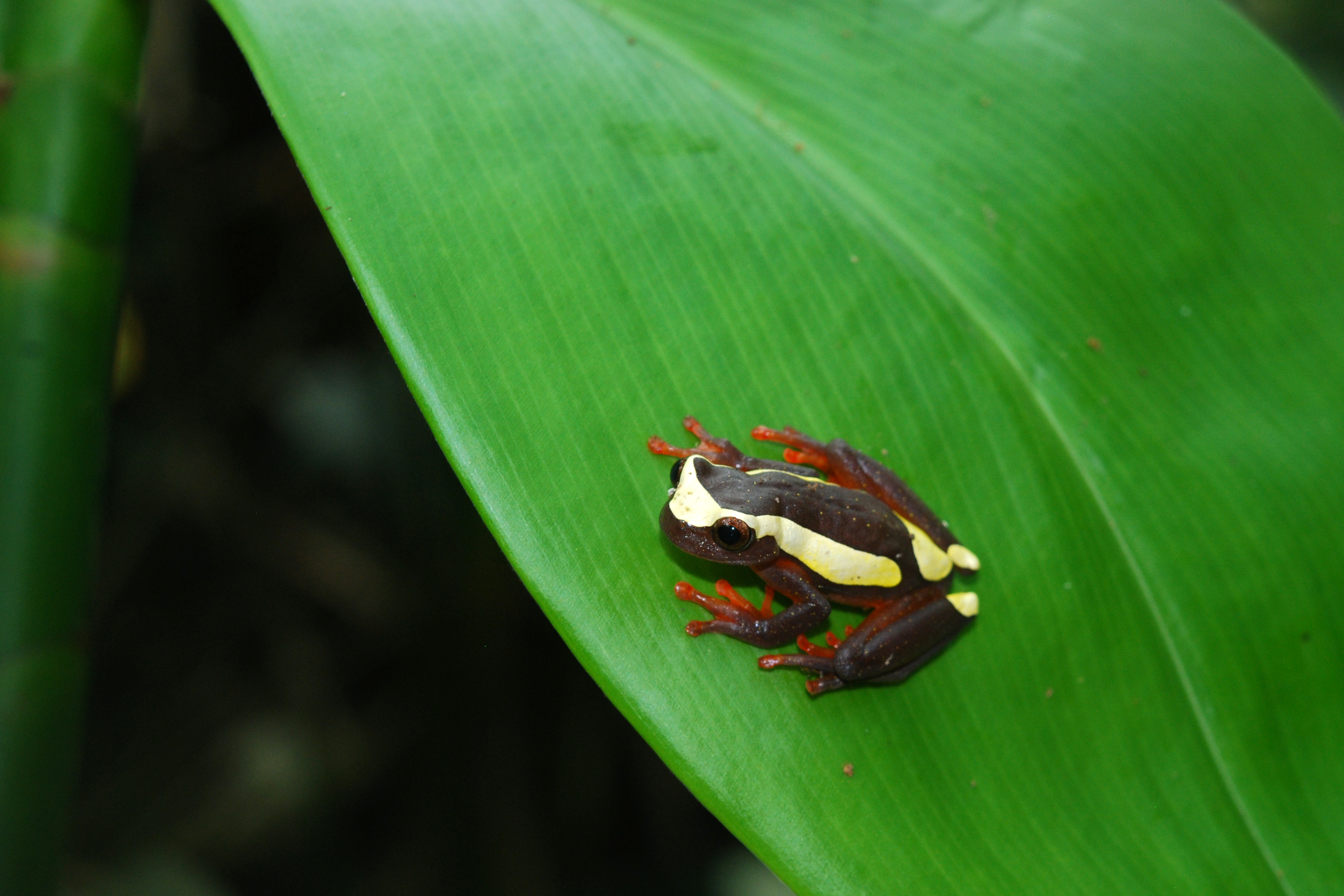
- Dendropsophus bifurcus
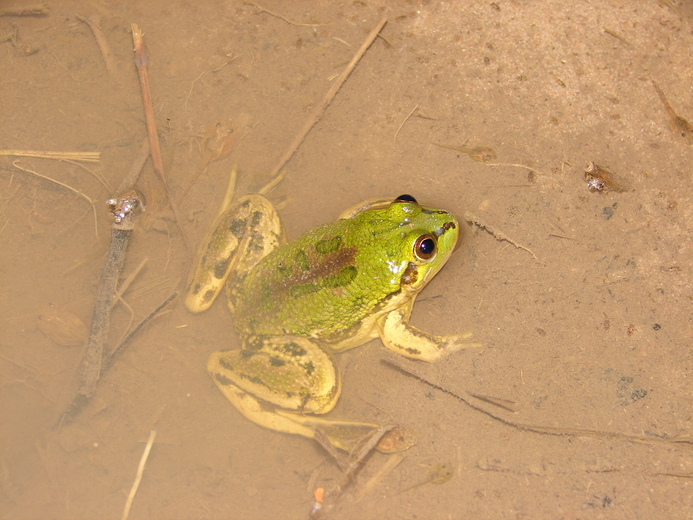
- Pseudis bolbodactyla

Scientific classification
- Kingdom: Animalia
- Phylum: Chordata
- Class: Amphibia
- Order: Anura
- Family: Hylidae
- Subfamily: Hylinae
- Tribe: Dendropsophini; Fitzinger, 1843

Type genus
- Dendropsophus Fitzinger, 1843

Genera
- 9 genera (see text)

Synonyms
- Dendropsophinae Fitzinger, 1843; Pseudinae Fitzinger, 1843; Scinaxinae Duellman, Marion & Hedges, 2016

= Dendropsophini =

Subfamily of amphibians

Dendropsophini is a tribe of small neotropical tree frogs in the subfamily Hylinae. They are distributed from southern Mexico, throughout Central America, and down South America (including Trinidad) to northern Argentina and Uruguay. Removed from the synonymy of Hylinae in 2016, this taxon was formerly considered its own subfamily before being reclassified as a tribe. As defined by Favovich et al. in 2005, the tribe Dendrosophini contains the members of three former subfamilies within the Hylidae prior to taxonomic rearrangement: Dendropsophinae, Pseudinae, and Scinaxinae.

== Taxonomy ==
=== Genera ===
The following genera are included in the tribe Dendropsophini:

- Dendropsophus Fitzinger, 1843
- Julianus Duellman, Marion & Hedges, 2016
- Lysapsus Cope, 1862
- Ololygon Fitzinger, 1830
- Pseudis Wagler, 1830
- Scarthyla William Edward Duellman and de Sá, 1988
- Scinax Wagler, 1830
- Sphaenorhynchus Tschudi, 1838
- Xenohyla Izecksohn, 1998

=== Evolution ===
The tribe name comes from the Greek word dendron which means "tree" and psophos which means "sound" or "noise," referring to how some of these frogs are more easily heard from up in the trees than seen. They first evolved during the Eocene 39.1–50.8 Mya and diversifying during the early Oligocene 25.3–38.5 Mya.

The sister taxon of the pseudines (formerly the subfamily Pseudinae) are the dendropsophines (containing only Dendropsophus and Xenohyla), splitting apart from them during early Oligocene 25.8–38.7 Mya. Dendropsophines remained tree frogs and diversified greatly, while Pseudine frogs transitioned to aquatic ecosystems. Scarthyla is the oldest and most hylid-like of the pseudines, originating in the central Amazon basin and being restricted to the Guiana region in modern times. Lysapsus and Pseudis diverged during the early Miocene 18.4–24.6 Mya and have since spread down to the Chaco region that is drier and less suited for most tree frogs. Scinaxine frogs evolved approximately 42.0–56.4 Mya during the Oligocene. The most primitive of the Scinaxine frogs is Sphaeorhynchus, which remained in the Atlantic Coastal Forest of Brazil while the other lineages evolved into Julianus in the southeast, Ololygon also in the Atlantic Coastal Forest, and Scinax in the Amazon Basin.

== Description ==
There are only two dendropsophines. Xenohyla is confined to only coastal Brazil, while the range of Dendropsophus is much larger. Xenohyla has 2n=24 chromosomes while Dendropsophus has 2n=30 chromosomes.

Pseudines are notable for because despite being tree frogs, they have convergently evolved with true frogs and have lost most of their tree dwelling traits, becoming semi-aquatic or aquatic. Their name references this similarity, with Pseudis coming from the Greek ψεῦδος (pseudos) which means "false" or "pretending". This is evident in how the intercalary elements, which are the spaces in between a frog's digits, have become ossified in order to strengthen them and help them swim in the water more efficiently. Normally in tree frogs, these intercalary elements remain unossified in order to allow their hands and feet to be flexible. They also have a unique ligament cap that connects their knee to their pelvis that has not yet been seen in any other type of frog. These frogs have a chromosome component of 2n = 24, the exceptions being Scarthyla goinorum with 2n = 22 and Pseudis cardosoi with 2n = 28. In the wild they are preyed on by a variety of animals, including aquatic insects, spiders, and birds such as the buff-necked ibis and large-billed tern.

The scinaxines are small to medium-sized frogs with pointy snouts, and often stowaway on products such as house plants and fruit. Because of this, two species of Scinax have been introduced outside of their native range, with Scinax quinquefasciatus on the Galapagos Islands and Scinax ruber on St. Lucia, Martinique, and Puerto Rico.
