= Paulo's frog =

Paulo's frog may refer to:

- Paulo's lime tree frog, a frog endemic to Brazil
- Paulo's robber frog, a frog endemic to Brazil
