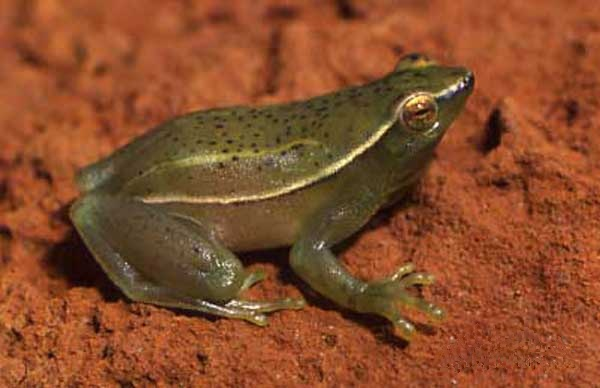

Conservation status
- Least Concern (IUCN 3.1)

Scientific classification
- Kingdom: Animalia
- Phylum: Chordata
- Class: Amphibia
- Order: Anura
- Family: Hylidae
- Genus: Sphaenorhynchus
- Species: S. surdus

Binomial name
- Sphaenorhynchus surdus (Cochran, 1953)

Synonyms
- Hyla aurantiaca surda Cochran, 1953; Sphoenohyla surda (Cochran, 1953)

= Sphaenorhynchus surdus =

Species of amphibian

Sphaenorhynchus surdus, or Cochran's lime treefrog, is a species of frog in the family Hylidae. It is endemic to southern Brazil and is known from the eastern Paraná, Santa Catarina, and northeastern Rio Grande do Sul states. Before Sphaenorhynchus caramaschii was described in 2007, all Sphaenorhynchus from the south of the state of São Paulo state all way south to Rio Grande do Sul were identified as S. surdus.

== Description ==
Adult males measure 23–29 mm (0.91–1.14 in) in snout–vent length. There is a dark dorso-lateral line running from the snout almost to the groin. No externally visible tympanum is present. A late-stage tadpole (Gosner stage 37) measured 53.5 mm (2.11 in) in total length, of which the body made 18.5 mm (0.73 in). Males call from the floating vegetation during the hot, rainy season. The call is short, usually less than 2 seconds in duration. The dominant frequency is 2.2–2.4 kHz.

== Habitat and conservation ==
The species' natural habitats are low bushes surrounding large permanent lakes at elevations of 100–1,200 m (330–3,940 ft) above sea level. Although an abundant species, water pollution is a threat to it.
