= Sphaenorhynchus bromelicola =

Conservation status
- Data Deficient (IUCN 3.1)

Scientific classification
- Kingdom: Animalia
- Phylum: Chordata
- Class: Amphibia
- Order: Anura
- Family: Hylidae
- Genus: Sphaenorhynchus
- Species: S. bromelicola

Binomial name
- Sphaenorhynchus bromelicola Bokermann, 1966

Species of amphibian

Sphaenorhynchus bromelicola, the Bahia lime treefrog, is a species of frog in the family Hylidae. It is endemic to eastern Brazil and only known from its type locality near Maracás, Bahia. It is similar to Sphaenorhynchus orophilus. It lives in terrestrial bromeliads on the forest edge and in open areas. The tadpoles develop in permanent pools. It is abundant at the type locality. Potential threats to this species include habitat loss caused by agriculture, wood plantations, logging, collection of bromeliads and human settlement, though data is insufficient to grant it conservation status.
