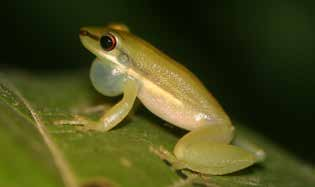
- Male calling

Conservation status
- Least Concern (IUCN 3.1)

Scientific classification
- Kingdom: Animalia
- Phylum: Chordata
- Class: Amphibia
- Order: Anura
- Family: Hylidae
- Genus: Scarthyla
- Species: S. vigilans

Binomial name
- Scarthyla vigilans (Solano, 1971)

Synonyms
- Hyla vigilans Solano, 1971

= Scarthyla vigilans =

Maracaibo Basin treefrog

Species of frog

Scarthyla vigilans (Maracaibo Basin treefrog) is a species of frog in the family Hylidae. It is found in northern Colombia (Caribbean lowlands, Magdalena Valley, and eastern llanos), northern Venezuela (Maracaibo Basin, Falcón, Coastal Range, high Llanos and Orinoco Delta), and Trinidad. Although generic allocation of this species has been controversial, molecular data have now confirmed its close relationship with Scarthyla goinorum and placement in that genus. Indeed, adults are very similar to Scarthyla goinorum; however, the male advertisement call and tadpoles are clearly distinct.

== Description ==
Scarthyla vigilans are small frogs, with a maximum size of 21 mm (0.8 in) in snout–vent length. The body is elongate and slender. The head is as wide as the body and longer than it is wide. The snout is long and acuminate. The eyes are moderately large and protuberant. The tympanum is distinct although partly obscured by the diffuse supratympanic fold. The fingers and toes are slender and bear small round discs. The fingers lack webbing while the toes are webbed. Night-time coloration is lime green with indistinct stripes; the ventral parts are transparent. During the day, the coloration is more contrasting. Males have a single subgular vocal sac.

The male advertisement call resembles a cricket chirp (and can be mistaken as such) and has very low intensity.

The tadpoles have short, globular body and moderately long tail. The maximum total length is 32 mm (1.3 in).

== Habitat and conservation ==
Scarthyla vigilans occurs in open environments of lowlands, including flooded grasslands, degraded areas with low vegetation, and shallow standing water. Breeding takes place in standing water and swamps. Its maximum altitude is about 600 m (2,000 ft) above sea level, although most records are from lower elevations. It is a very common but nocturnal, small, and inconspicuous species. The call is relatively low and easily masked by other calling frogs. It is adaptable and not facing any known threats. It is present in some protected areas.
