= S. palustris =

S. palustris may refer to:

- Sorex palustris, a species of semi-aquatic shrew found in North America
- Sphaenorhynchus palustris, a frog species endemic to Brazil
- Stachys palustris, the marsh woundwort, an edible perennial grassland herb species
- Stagnicola palustris, a species of air-breathing freshwater snail, an aquatic pulmonate gastropod mollusk in the family Lymnaeidae, the pond snails
- Sylvilagus palustris, the marsh rabbit, a mammal species found in marshes and swamps of coastal regions of the Eastern and Southern United States
