= L. laevis =

L. laevis may refer to:

- Lacerta laevis, a lizard species found in Cyprus, Israel, Jordan, Lebanon, Palestine, Syria and Turkey
- Lepidobatrachus laevis, the escuerzo, Budget frog or wide-mouth frog, a frog species found in Argentina, Bolivia and Paraguay
- Lysapsus laevis, a frog species found in Bolivia, Brazil and Guyana

== See also ==
- List of Latin and Greek words commonly used in systematic names#L
