= P. minuta =

P. minuta may refer to:

- Plethodontohyla minuta, a frog species endemic to Madagascar
- Pseudis minuta, a frog species found in Argentina, Brazil and Uruguay

== See also ==
- Minuta
