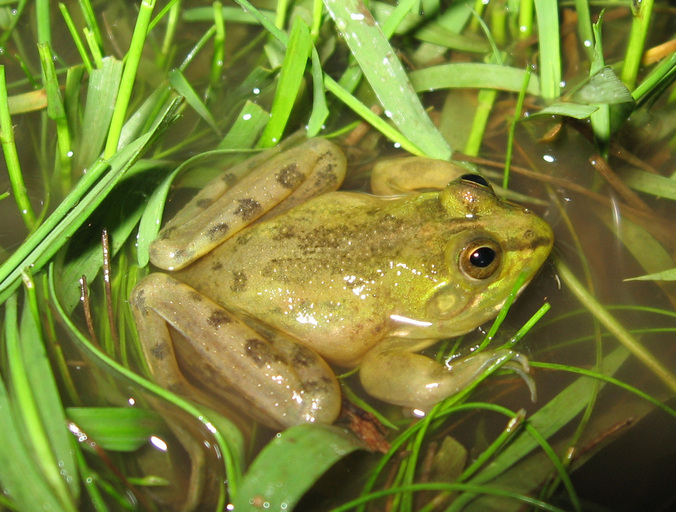
- Pseudis minuta

Scientific classification
- Kingdom: Animalia
- Phylum: Chordata
- Class: Amphibia
- Order: Anura
- Family: Hylidae
- Subfamily: Hylinae
- Tribe: Dendropsophini
- Genus: Pseudis; Wagler, 1830

Type species
- Rana paradoxa Linnaeus, 1758

Species
- See text.

= Pseudis =

Genus of amphibians

Pseudis is a genus of South American frogs (swimming frogs) in the family Hylidae. They are often common and frequently heard, but easily overlooked because of their camouflage and lifestyle, living in lakes, ponds, marshes and similar waters with extensive aquatic vegetation, often sitting at the surface among plants or on floating plants, but rapidly diving if disturbed. Whereas the adults are medium-sized frogs, their tadpoles are large; in some species the world's longest.

== Distribution ==
Pseudis species are distributed throughout tropical and subtropical South America, almost entirely east of the Andes (P. paradoxa is the only species with populations west of the Andes, in Colombia). They are found from Trinidad to northern Argentina, being absent only in Ecuador and Chile, highland regions, and the southernmost part of South America. All species occur in Brazil, and P. bolbodactyla, P. cardosoi, P. fusca and P. tocantins are endemic to this country.

== Description ==
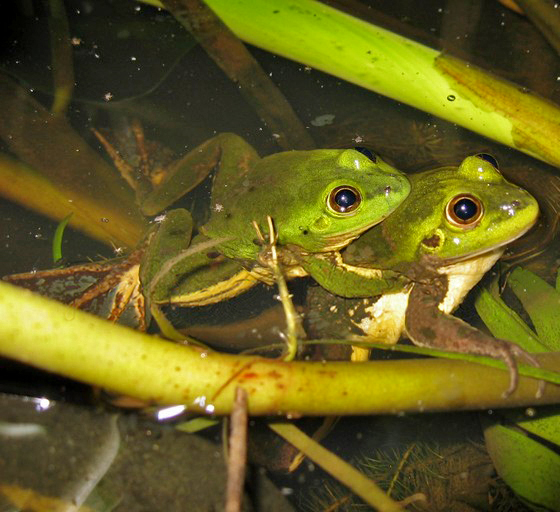
Mating P. paradoxa

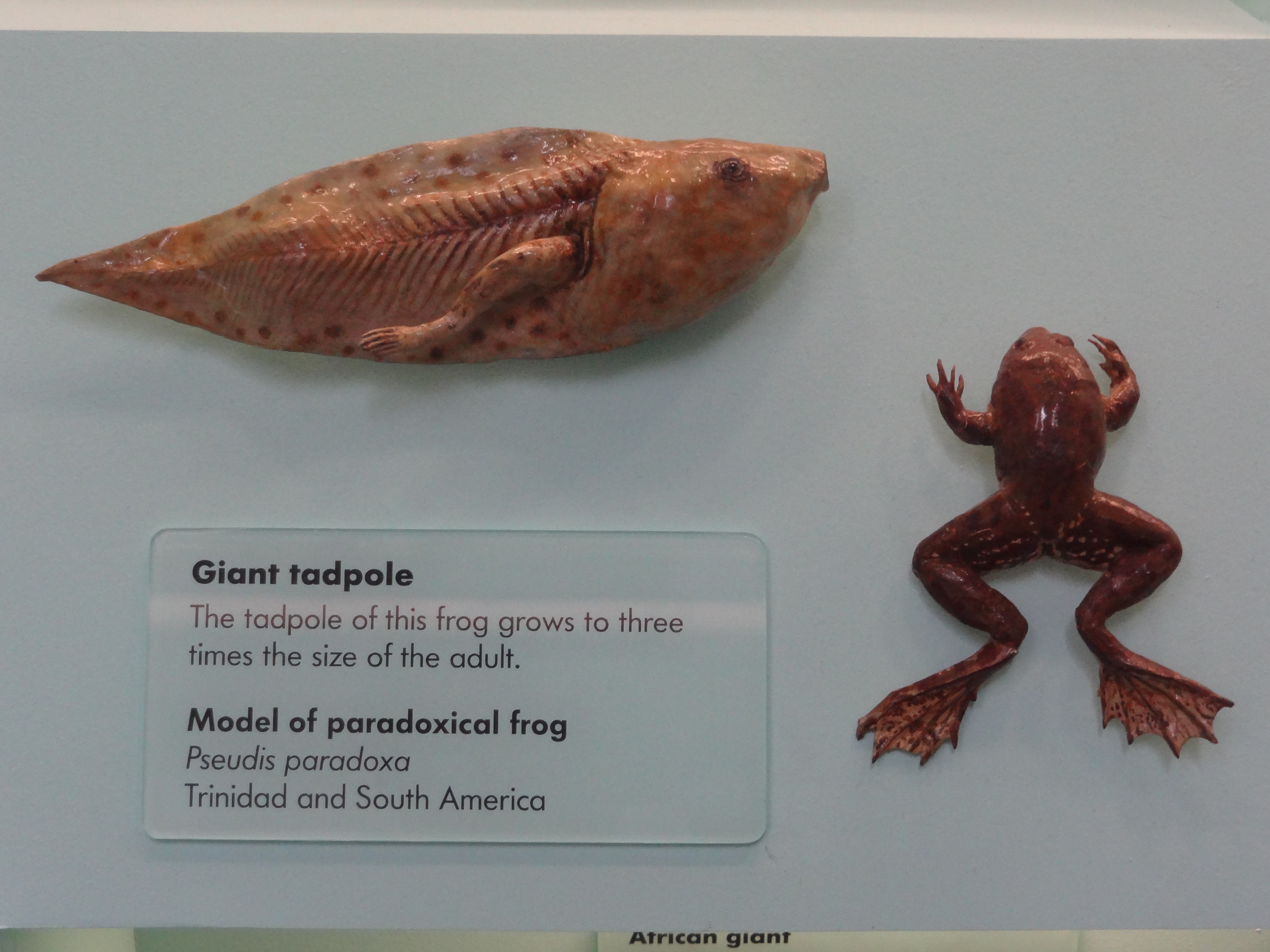
Models of full-grown tadpole and adult P. paradoxa

These frogs have several adaptations to aquatic life, such as protuberant eyes, robust hind limbs, and fully webbed feet. Nevertheless, they belong to the "true" tree frogs, family Hylidae.

=== Breeding and feeding ===
Mating and egg-laying in Pseudis is typical of frogs. What sets them apart is their tadpoles that start out as fairly normal, but continue growing until reaching gigantic sizes, sometimes as much as 22–27 cm (9–11 in) in length in P. paradoxa and P. platensis. They are the longest known tadpoles and also large compared to the adult frogs, which are 3.4–7.6 cm (1.3–3.0 in) in snout–to–vent length. Less data is available for the tadpoles of most others members of the genus, but they too reach large sizes, although perhaps somewhat less than P. paradoxa and P. platensis. Their adult frogs also average somewhat smaller with snout–to–vent lengths of 2.4–6.6 cm (0.9–2.6 in). However, there are two outliers in the genus: The closely related P. cardosoi and P. minuta (equalling the proposed genus Podonectes, see Phylogenetic relationships) have more normal tadpoles that are not known to surpass lengths of c. 9 cm (3.5 in). This is still large compared to the adults of these two species, meaning that they too "shrink" during metamorphosis from tadpole to frog. In most if not all the species, there are noticeable local variations in the final size of the tadpoles, with those in large temporary waters with plenty of food and few aquatic predators growing larger than those in smaller waters with less food or waters with more aquatic predators. In at least the species with very large tadpoles, their final stages have unusually well-developed organs, including nearly ripe reproductive organs. This means that recently metamorphosed frogs rapidly reach maturity and essentially stop growing, whereas most other frogs take more time and growing after metamorphosis before they become mature.

Pseudis is closely related to a second genus, Lysapsus, that lacks giant tadpoles and in which adults are smaller, up to 2.5 cm (1.0 in).

Pseudis tadpoles feed mostly on a wide range of algae, but also take small invertebrates. The adult frogs feed mostly on land-based insects and spiders, but also other land-based or aquatic invertebrates, small frogs and—in some species—plant material.

== Species ==
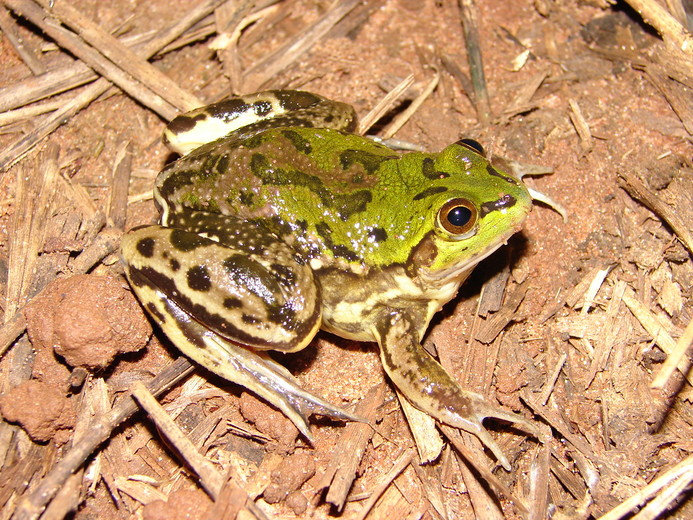
P. bolbodactyla, one of several species formerly included in P. paradoxa

There are seven species in this genus (given that Lysapsus is accepted as a separate genus). Until the late 1990s and early 2000s, most authorities only recognized P. minuta and P. paradoxa, but P. cardosoi was described in 2010 (having formerly been included as a population of P. minuta), while the remaining were considered subspecies, synonyms or populations of P. paradoxa. The validity of P. platensis as a species separate from P. paradoxa is questionable.

Binomial name and author	Common name
Pseudis bolbodactyla Lutz, 1925
Pseudis cardosoi Kwet, 2000
Pseudis fusca Garman, 1883
Pseudis minuta Günther, 1858	lesser swimming frog
Pseudis paradoxa (Linnaeus, 1758)	paradoxical frog
Pseudis platensis Gallardo, 1961
Pseudis tocantins Caramaschi & Cruz, 1998

== Phylogenetic relationships ==
The phylogenetic position of frogs currently included in the genus Pseudis in relation to other anurans was for a long time a matter of debate. They have been placed in Ranidae, Leptodactylidae, Hylidae, and as their own family Pseudidae This results from their highly derived body plan for a hylid frog due to their mostly aquatic habits. Recent morphological and molecular phylogenetic reconstructions have unambiguously placed them within the subfamily Hylinae with Scarthyla as a sister group.

Phylogenetic relationships among species of the group were recently proposed using molecular evidences. Both publications found identical trees, but proposed different taxonomic solutions for the nonmonophyly of Pseudis, either resurrecting the genus Podonectes or placing Lysapsus as a junior synonym of Pseudis. More recent molecular evidence did not find Pseudis paraphyletic with respect to Lysapsus, so the synonymy is unnecessary.

Intrinsic phylogeny tree of genus Pseudis:

- - - Pseudis laevis
    - - Pseudis limellum
      - Pseudis caraya
  - - - Pseudis cardosoi
      - Pseudis minuta
    - - - Pseudis fusca
        - Pseudis tocantins
      - - Pseudis bolbodactyla
        - Pseudis paradoxa
