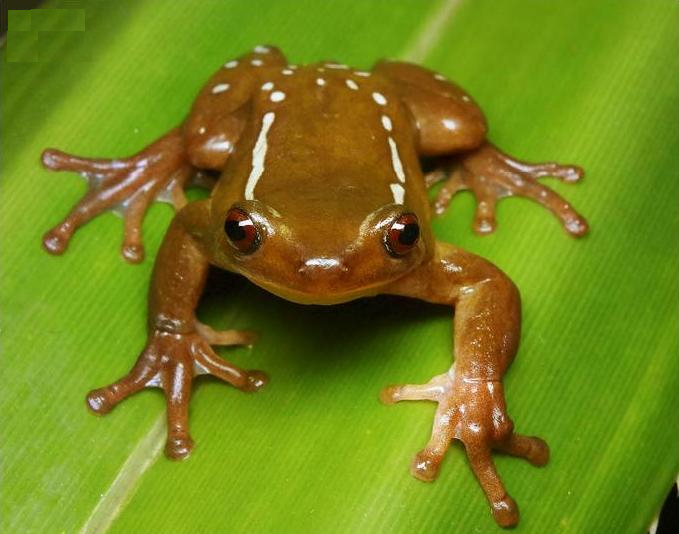

Conservation status
- Least Concern (IUCN 3.1)

Scientific classification
- Kingdom: Animalia
- Phylum: Chordata
- Class: Amphibia
- Order: Anura
- Family: Hylidae
- Genus: Xenohyla
- Species: X. eugenioi

Binomial name
- Xenohyla eugenioi (Caramaschi, 1998)

= Xenohyla eugenioi =

Species of amphibian

Xenohyla eugenioi is a species of tree frog in the Hylidae family native to northeastern Brazil in ecotones between the Atlantic Forest and caatingas. It has been found in the Brazilian states of Bahia and Sergipe, approximately 1,000 km away from the other species in its genus, Xenohyla truncata. Like its relative, this frog spends the day hiding in bromeliads, emerging at night to hunt and forage. This frog has been observed between 128 and 960 meters above sea level.

This frog is not endangered, but scientists note that there may be some threat from the collection of bromeliad plants and habitat loss associated with agriculture, livestock grazing, and logging.

X. eugenioi keeps its white stripes through adulthood. Additionally, the species prefers to inhabit agrestes, and breeds in temporary pools formed by rainwater. Males grow from 30.9 to 31.5 mm (1.22 to 1.24 in) SVL while females reach 39.5 to 45.5 mm (1.56 to 1.8 in) SVL. It is currently unknown if this frog is also frugivorous like its relative.

Xenohyla eugenioi is named after the Brazilian herpetologist Eugênio Izecksohn. Izecksohn described the type species Hyla truncata in 1959 and later established the genus Xenohyla where he transferred it to in 1998.
