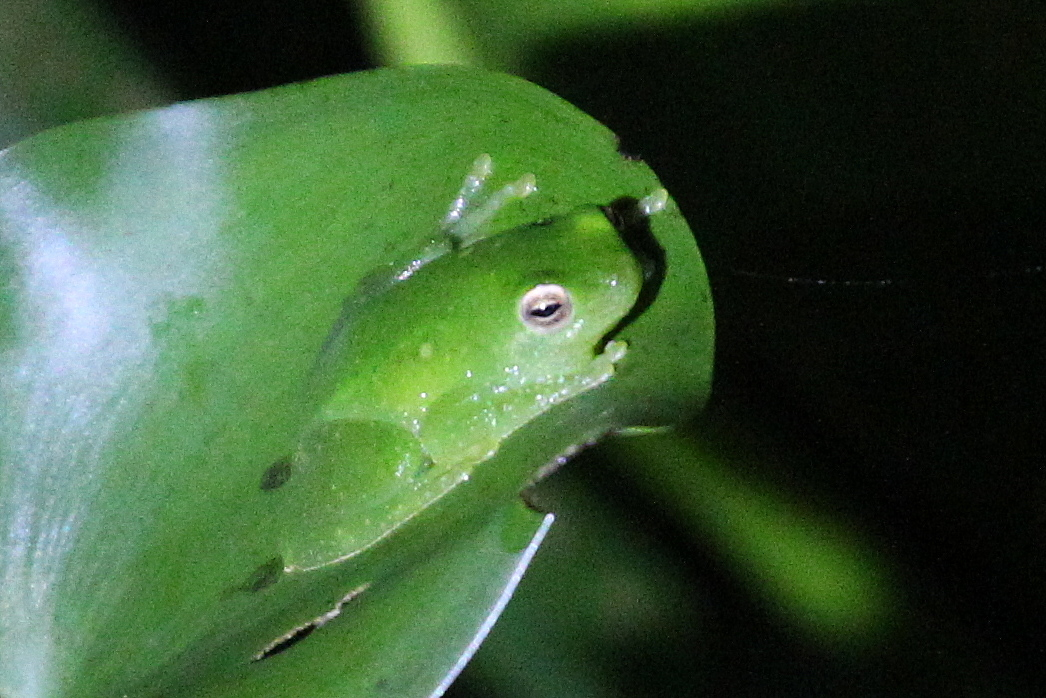

Conservation status
- Least Concern (IUCN 3.1)

Scientific classification
- Kingdom: Animalia
- Phylum: Chordata
- Class: Amphibia
- Order: Anura
- Family: Hylidae
- Genus: Sphaenorhynchus
- Species: S. dorisae

Binomial name
- Sphaenorhynchus dorisae (Goin, 1957)

Synonyms
- Sphoenohyla dorisae Goin, 1957

= Sphaenorhynchus dorisae =

Doris' lime treefrog

Species of amphibian

Sphaenorhynchus dorisae, the Doris' lime treefrog, is a species of frog in the family Hylidae. It is found in the upper Amazon Basin of southeastern Colombia (Amazonas Department), Ecuador, Brazil and Peru. It might also be present in Bolivia.

== Etymology ==
The specific name dorisae honors Doris Mable Cochran, an American herpetologist.

== Description ==
Adult males measure 26–29 mm (1.0–1.1 in) and females 36–40 mm (1.4–1.6 in) in snout–vent length. The snout is rounded in dorsal view. The tympanum is small and indistinct. The fingers are one-third webbed whereas the toes are fully webbed. The dorsum is bright green with small dark spots or lavender green with small spots that are white to yellow. The venter is white. The iris is bronze.

== Habitat and conservation ==
Sphaenorhynchus dorisae is a semi-aquatic species that inhabits open permanent and semi-permanent bodies of water such as ponds, large lakes, and flooded meadows at elevations of 40–300 m (130–980 ft) above sea level. They are commonly found amidst floating vegetation, in particular water lettuce (Pistia). It can locally be threatened by habitat loss.
