= Pseudis fusca =

Conservation status
- Least Concern (IUCN 3.1)

Scientific classification
- Kingdom: Animalia
- Phylum: Chordata
- Class: Amphibia
- Order: Anura
- Family: Hylidae
- Genus: Pseudis
- Species: P. fusca

Binomial name
- Pseudis fusca Garman, 1883

Synonyms
- Batrachichthys pizarronis Garman, 1883; Pseudis paradoxa fusca — Bokermann, 1966

Species of frog

Pseudis fusca is a species of frog in the family Hylidae. It is endemic to Minas Gerais, Brazil, and only known few localities. Although it is currently considered a valid species, it has also been treated as a subspecies of Pseudis paradoxa.

== Description ==
Adult males measure 36–41 mm (1.4–1.6 in) and adult females 41–46 mm (1.6–1.8 in) in snout–vent length. The overall appearance is robust. The head is wider than it is long and the snout is rounded. The tympanum is distinct, elliptical in shape. The eyes are big. The toes are fully webbed. Skin is smooth. Preserved specimens are dorsally brown or grey, with darker markings that do not form any regular pattern.

== Habitat and conservation ==
This aquatic frog occurs in permanent ponds and still-water pools of slow moving streams near larger rivers at an elevation of about 500 m (1,600 ft) above sea level. It can also occur in large water reservoirs. Breeding takes place in pools and streams. It is a locally common species that can suffer from habitat loss caused by agricultural encroachment, infrastructure development, and agricultural pollution. Its presence in protected areas is unknown.
