= Hyla lactea =

Hyla lactea is an unaccepted scientific name and may refer to two different species of frogs:

- Rusty tree frog, found in South America and Panama
- Sphaenorhynchus lacteus, found in northern South America and Trinidad
