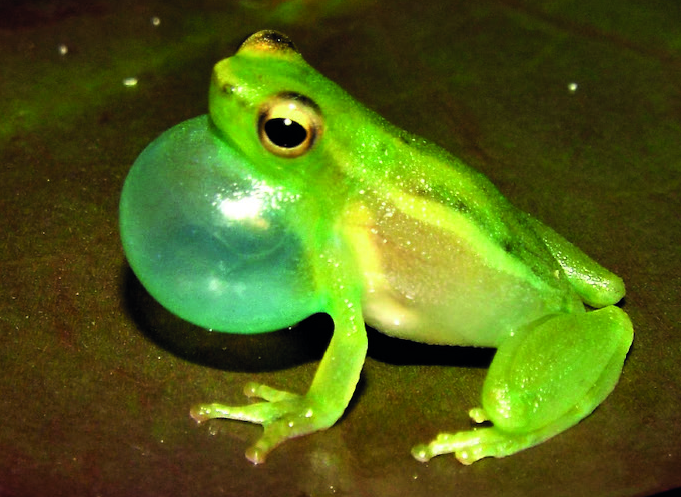
- Amapá, Brazil

Conservation status
- Least Concern (IUCN 3.1)

Scientific classification
- Kingdom: Animalia
- Phylum: Chordata
- Class: Amphibia
- Order: Anura
- Family: Hylidae
- Genus: Sphaenorhynchus
- Species: S. carneus

Binomial name
- Sphaenorhynchus carneus (Cope, 1868)

Synonyms
- Hylella carnea Cope, 1868; Sphoenohyla habra Goin, 1957; Sphaenorhynchus habrus (Goin, 1957)

= Sphaenorhynchus carneus =

Napo lime treefrog

Species of amphibian

Sphaenorhynchus carneus, the Napo lime treefrog, is a species of frog in the family Hylidae. It is found in the upper Amazon Basin in southern Colombia, Ecuador, Peru and in central Amazonia in Brazil. It might also occur in Bolivia.

Sphaenorhynchus carneus is a semi-aquatic species found in permanent and semi permanent ponds in open areas, in ponds in primary forest, and on floating mats of vegetation in large rivers. It is reasonably common species which might locally suffer from habitat loss. It is present in many protected areas.
