= Eleutherodactylus goini =

Conservation status
- Vulnerable (IUCN 3.1)

Scientific classification
- Kingdom: Animalia
- Phylum: Chordata
- Class: Amphibia
- Order: Anura
- Clade: Brachycephaloidea
- Family: Eleutherodactylidae
- Genus: Eleutherodactylus
- Species: E. goini

Binomial name
- Eleutherodactylus goini Schwartz, 1960

Synonyms
- Eleutherdactylus ricordi goini Schwartz, 1960; Eleutherodactylus planirostris goini Schwartz, 1960; Euhyas goini (Schwartz, 1960)

Species of amphibian

Eleutherodactylus goini, also known commonly as the Guaniguanico yellow-mottled frog, is a species of frog in the family Eleutherodactylidae. The species is endemic to Cuba.

== Etymology ==
The specific name, goini, is in honor of American herpetologist Coleman Jett Goin.

== Habitat ==
The natural habitats of Eleutherodactylus goini are subtropical or tropical moist lowland forest and rocky areas.

== Conservation status ==
Eleutherodactylus goini is threatened by habitat loss.
