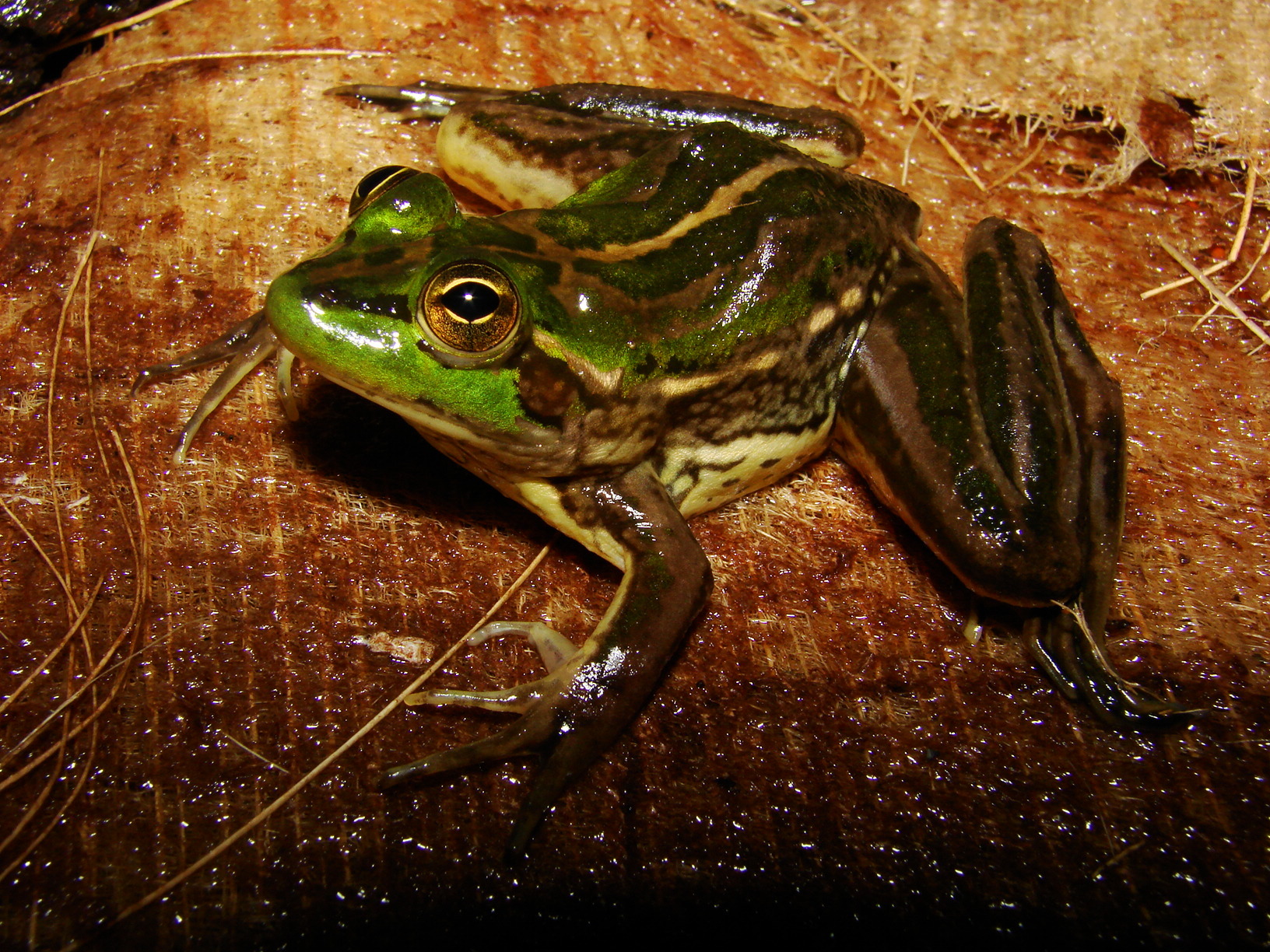

Conservation status
- Least Concern (IUCN 3.1)

Scientific classification
- Kingdom: Animalia
- Phylum: Chordata
- Class: Amphibia
- Order: Anura
- Family: Hylidae
- Genus: Pseudis
- Species: P. tocantins

Binomial name
- Pseudis tocantins Caramaschi and Cruz, 1998

= Pseudis tocantins =

Species of amphibian

Pseudis tocantins is a species of aquatic frog in the family Hylidae. It is endemic to central Brazil where it occurs in the eponymous state of Tocantins, as well as in Goiás, Mato Grosso, and Maranhão states, in the Tocantins and Araguaia River basins.

== Description ==
Adult females measure 36–38 mm (1.4–1.5 in) in snout–vent length. The overall appearance is robust. The head is longer than it is wide and the snout is rounded. The tympanum is distinct, elliptical in shape. The eyes are big. The toes are fully webbed. Skin is mostly smooth. Preserved specimens are dorsally brown with darker markings.

== Habitat and conservation ==
Pseudis tocantins is an aquatic frog found in permanent ponds, lakes and swamps. Breeding takes place in these same habitats. It is a common species, but it can be threatened by expanding agriculture, overgrazing, infrastructure development (both expanding human settlements and dams), and water pollution. Indeed, the type locality has probably already been decimated by dam construction. Nevertheless, this species is present in several protected areas.
