= Sphaenorhynchus mirim =

Conservation status
- Data Deficient (IUCN 3.1)

Scientific classification
- Kingdom: Animalia
- Phylum: Chordata
- Class: Amphibia
- Order: Anura
- Family: Hylidae
- Genus: Sphaenorhynchus
- Species: S. mirim

Binomial name
- Sphaenorhynchus mirim Caramaschi, Almeida, and Gasparini, 2009

Species of frog

Sphaenorhynchus mirim is a frog. Scientists have seen it in one place: Fazenda Gemada in Brazil.

The adult male frog measures 15.7–18.2 mm in snout-vent length. The frog's head is wider than it is long. The skin of the dorsum is bright green in color with white spots. Parts of the toes are yellow in color. The ventrum and vocal sac are whitish green.

Some reports indicate that this frog may undergo early sexual maturation. Scientists note that the tadpoles develop reproductive organs before undergoing metamorphosis. Scientists think this is so they can reproduce soon after becoming frogs. The authors of the original description note that the rest of the tadpoles' bodies develop at the normal rate, making it unlikely that the development observed in their study was due to exposure to pharmaceutical pollutants.

This frog is sympatric to Dendropsophus elegans, Dendropsophus minutus, and Scinax alter.
