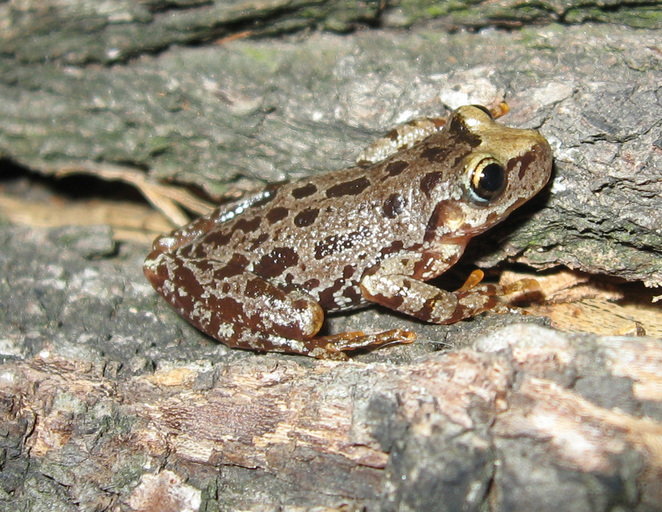

Conservation status
- Least Concern (IUCN 3.1)

Scientific classification
- Kingdom: Animalia
- Phylum: Chordata
- Class: Amphibia
- Order: Anura
- Family: Hylidae
- Genus: Julianus
- Species: J. uruguayus

Binomial name
- Julianus uruguayus (Schmidt, 1944)

Synonyms
- Scinax uruguayus (Schmidt, 1944)

= Julianus uruguayus =

Schmidt's Uruguay tree frog

Species of amphibian

Julianus uruguayus (commonly known as Schmidt's Uruguay tree frog) is a species of frog in the family Hylidae. It is found in Argentina, Brazil, and Uruguay. Its natural habitats are moist savanna, subtropical or tropical seasonally wet or flooded lowland grassland, freshwater marshes, and intermittent freshwater marshes. It is threatened by habitat loss.
