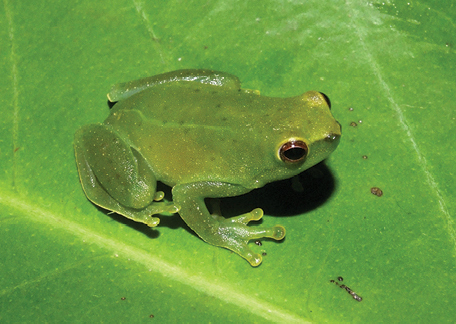

Conservation status
- Least Concern (IUCN 3.1)

Scientific classification
- Kingdom: Animalia
- Phylum: Chordata
- Class: Amphibia
- Order: Anura
- Family: Hylidae
- Genus: Sphaenorhynchus
- Species: S. prasinus

Binomial name
- Sphaenorhynchus prasinus Bokermann, 1973

= Sphaenorhynchus prasinus =

Species of amphibian

Sphaenorhynchus prasinus, or Bokermann's lime treefrog, is a species of frog in the family Hylidae. It is endemic to eastern and southeastern Brazil and occurs in the states of Pernambuco, Alagoas, Bahia, and Minas Gerais.

The species occurs in secondary forest, clearings in forest, and forest edges at elevations below 500 m (1,600 ft) above sea level. Breeding takes place in temporary ponds. It is locally very abundant, but its population is believed to decreasing, probably due to habitat loss.
