= Lysapsus caraya =

Conservation status
- Least Concern (IUCN 3.1)

Scientific classification
- Kingdom: Animalia
- Phylum: Chordata
- Class: Amphibia
- Order: Anura
- Family: Hylidae
- Genus: Lysapsus
- Species: L. caraya

Binomial name
- Lysapsus caraya Gallardo, 1964

Synonyms
- Pseudis caraya (Gallardo, 1964)

Species of frog

Lysapsus caraya is a species of frog in the family Hylidae found in central and southern Brazil. Its common name is Mato Verde harlequin frog.

Lysapsus caraya is an aquatic frog of open flooded savanna. It also occurs on floating meadows of large rivers. It breeds in the associated waterways. Where it occurs it is common, and no threats are known.
