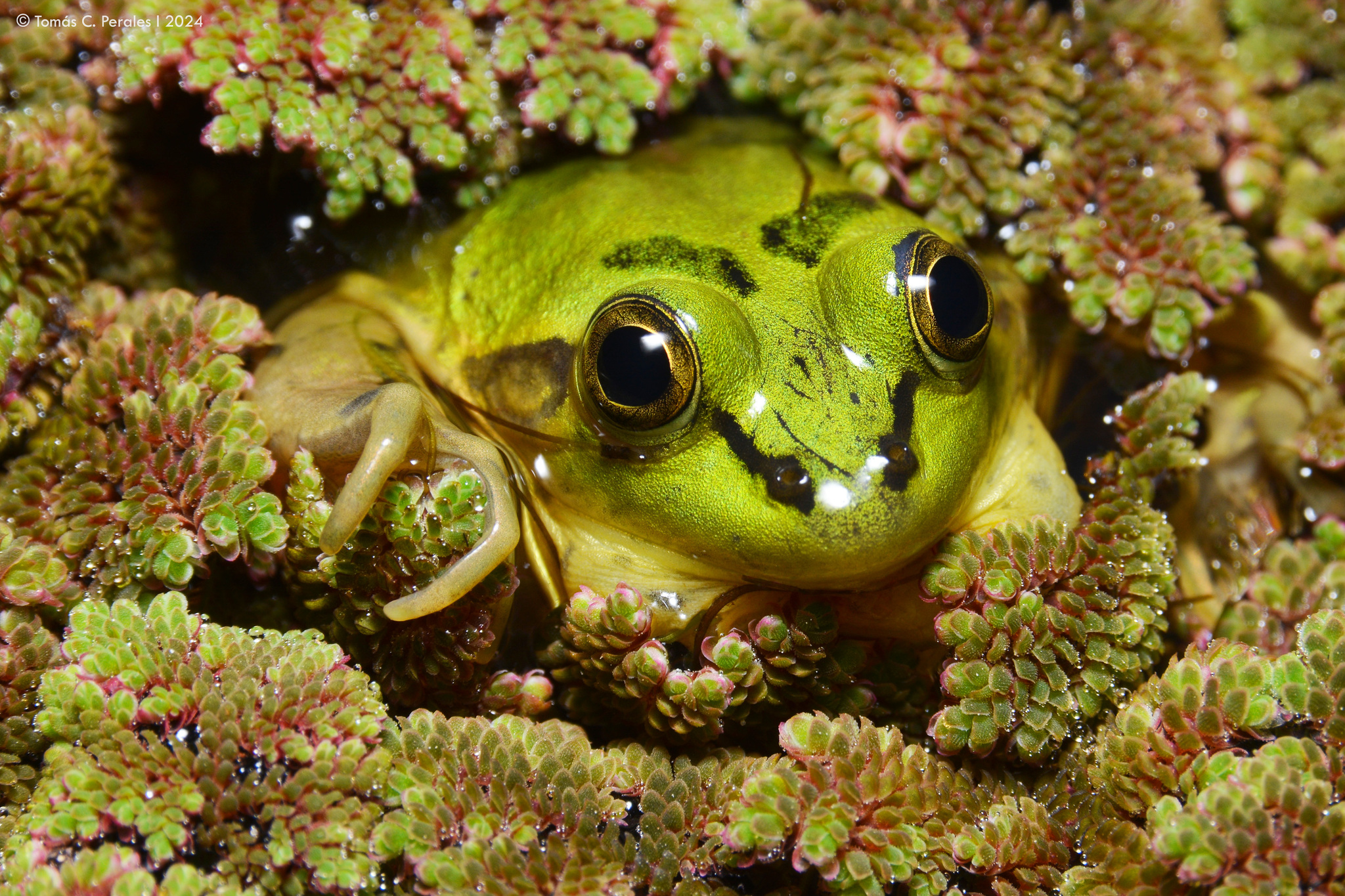

Conservation status
- Least Concern (IUCN 3.1)

Scientific classification
- Kingdom: Animalia
- Phylum: Chordata
- Class: Amphibia
- Order: Anura
- Family: Hylidae
- Genus: Pseudis
- Species: P. platensis

Binomial name
- Pseudis platensis Gallardo, 1961

Synonyms
- Pseudis paradoxus platensis Gallardo, 1961; Pseudis paradoxus occidentalis Gallardo, 1961

= Pseudis platensis =

Species of frog

Pseudis platensis is a frog in the family Hylidae. It is endemic to Bolivia, Paraguay, Argentina, and Brazil.

This frog had been considered a subspecies of Pseudis paradoxa but, after a genetic analysis in 2007, scientists concluded it should be considered a separate species.
