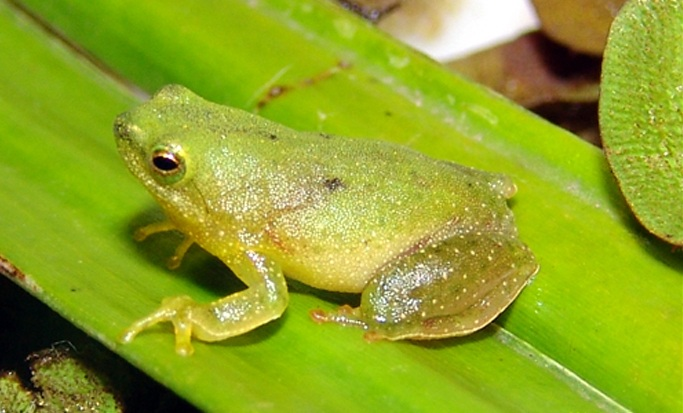

Conservation status
- Least Concern (IUCN 3.1)

Scientific classification
- Kingdom: Animalia
- Phylum: Chordata
- Class: Amphibia
- Order: Anura
- Family: Hylidae
- Genus: Sphaenorhynchus
- Species: S. planicola

Binomial name
- Sphaenorhynchus planicola (A. Lutz and B. Lutz 1938)

Synonyms
- Hyla (Sphoenohyla) planicola Lutz and Lutz, 1938

= Sphaenorhynchus planicola =

Rio lime treefrog

Species of amphibian

Sphaenorhynchus planicola, the Rio lime treefrog, is a species of frog in the family Hylidae. It is endemic to southeastern Brazil and occurs in the southern Bahia, Espírito Santo, and Rio de Janeiro states at elevations below 100 m (330 ft) above sea level.

Its natural habitats are swamps with deep water (>50 cm). It lives in floating vegetation; the eggs are laid on a leaf surface above the water. It can also live in cattle ponds with deep water. It is a very common species, but drainage of its habitat and pollution are threats.
