= Sphaenorhynchus botocudo =

Scientific classification
- Kingdom: Animalia
- Phylum: Chordata
- Class: Amphibia
- Order: Anura
- Family: Hylidae
- Genus: Sphaenorhynchus
- Species: S. botocudo

Binomial name
- Sphaenorhynchus botocudo Caramaschi, Almeida, and Gasparini, 2009

Species of frog

Sphaenorhynchus botocudo is a frog in the family Hylidae endemic to Brazil.

The adult male frog measures 23.9–29.3 mm in snout-vent length. It has a black line from the nose to each eye and a white spot under each eye. It has a white stripe outlined in brown from each eye to the groin.
