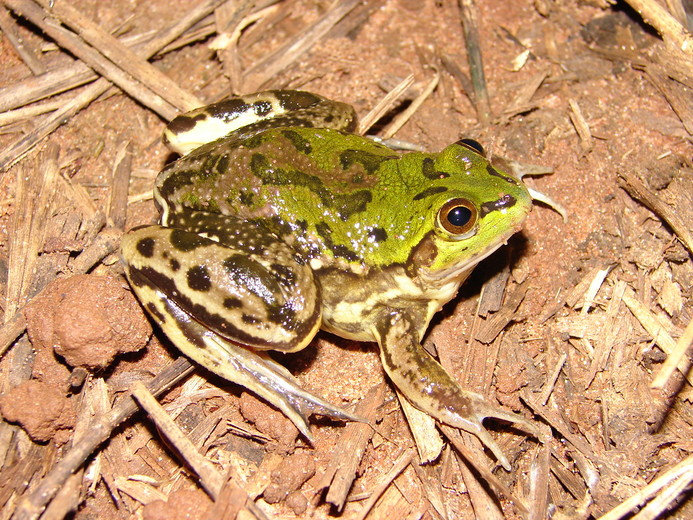

Conservation status
- Least Concern (IUCN 3.1)

Scientific classification
- Kingdom: Animalia
- Phylum: Chordata
- Class: Amphibia
- Order: Anura
- Family: Hylidae
- Genus: Pseudis
- Species: P. bolbodactyla

Binomial name
- Pseudis bolbodactyla A. Lutz, 1925

Synonyms
- Pseudis paradoxa bolbodactyla — Bokermann, 1966

= Pseudis bolbodactyla =

Species of frog

Pseudis bolbodactyla is a species of frog in the family Hylidae. It is endemic to southern Brazil and occurs in Minas Gerais, southern Goiás, southern Bahia, and northern Espírito Santo states. Although it is currently considered a valid species, it has also been treated as a subspecies of Pseudis paradoxa.

== Description ==
Adult males measure 34–45 mm (1.3–1.8 in) and adult females 38–51 mm (1.5–2.0 in) in snout–vent length. The overall appearance is robust. The head is about as wide as it is long and the snout is rounded. The tympanum is distinct, elliptical in shape. The eyes are big. The toes are fully webbed. Skin is dorsally rugose with many tiny tubercles. Preserved specimens are dorsally brown, with darker markings that may be interconnected but do not form any regular pattern.

A Gosner stage 39 tadpole measures 130 mm (5.1 in) in total length, of which the body makes 39 mm (1.5 in); the tail is thick and lanceolate.

== Habitat and ecology ==
This almost purely aquatic species occurs in lakes, ponds and other bodies of water in Cerrado and Caatinga savanna at elevations below 1,000 m (3,300 ft). One study suggests that it only occurs in ponds with aquatic vegetation. It is often found floating at the water surface, anchored motionless to the leaves of aquatic plants, with only the eyes, nostrils, and tympanum out of the water. It appears to use both visual and sensory clues to detect threats, to which it responds by diving. Breeding takes place in water.

Pseudis bolbodactyla is active both day and night. A study from Goiás found diet consisting primarily of insects, with a minor contribution of arachnids. The majority of the diet were diurnal insects associated with vegetation. Aquatic insects made a small contribution, and then as winged adults only. Pseudis bolbodactyla appears to be an opportunistic sit-and-wait predator.

== Conservation ==
Pseudis bolbodactyla is a common species that can suffer from overgrazing by domestic livestock, infrastructure development (including dams), and water pollution from agriculture. It is present in some protected areas.
