= Sphaenorhynchus cammaeus =

Scientific classification
- Kingdom: Animalia
- Phylum: Chordata
- Class: Amphibia
- Order: Anura
- Family: Hylidae
- Genus: Sphaenorhynchus
- Species: S. cammaeus

Binomial name
- Sphaenorhynchus cammaeus Roberto, Araujo-Vieira, Carvalho-e-Silva, and Ávila, 2017

Species of Amphibia

Sphaenorhynchus cammaeus is a frog in the family Hylidae endemic to Brazil. Scientists know it exclusively from the type locality: Reserva Biológica de Pedra Talhada, 850 meters above sea level.

The scientists who wrote original description cited an average snout-vent length among adult male frogs of 24.8–29.3 mm. Their only adult female specimen measured 26.6 mm.
