= Pseudin =

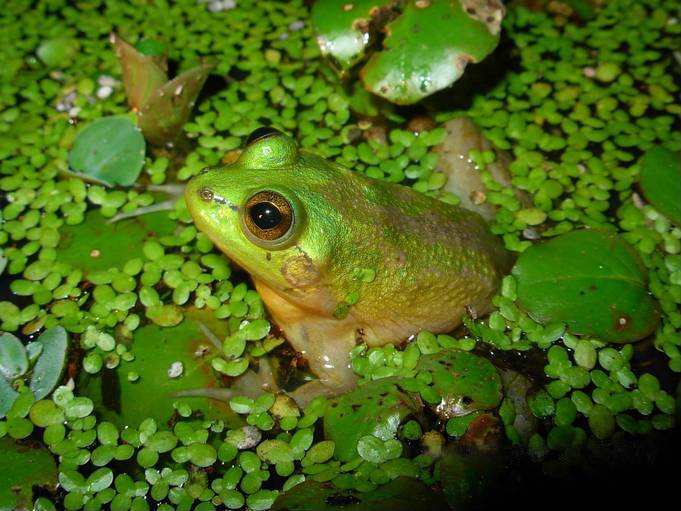
Pseudis paradoxa in El Frio Biological Station, Apure, Venezuela.

Pseudin is a peptide derived from Pseudis paradoxa. Pseudins have some antimicrobial function.

There are several different forms:

- pseudin-1
- pseudin-2 -- has been proposed as a treatment for type 2 diabetes.
- pseudin-4

== Pseudin-2 ==
Pseudin-2 is the most abundant version of the pseudins found on the skin of the paradoxical frog. The primary sequence reads as GLNALKKVFQGIHEAIKLINNHVQ. Its secondary/tertiary structure consists of one cationic amphipathic α-helix.

=== Antibacterial activity ===
Pseudin-2 was shown to have potent antibacterial activity, but a lower cytotoxicity. The cytotoxicity of a peptide can be measured by its effect on human erythrocytes. It takes a lower concentration of Pseudin-2 to kill bacteria or fungi such as E. coli, S. aureus, and C. albicans than to kill human erythrocytes. It is hypothesized that Pseudin-2 binding to the cell membrane of the bacteria results in a conformational change in which the peptide forms an α-helical shape, which allows it to perform cell lysis by inserting itself in the hydrophobic portion of the membrane. This mechanism is applicable to similar amphipathic α-helical peptides created by many frog species, although most of these peptides aren't very potent against bacteria. By increasing the cationicity and amphipathic nature of the molecule, it is possible to create analogues of Pseudin-2 that are even more selective towards bacteria. This is done by substituting leucine residues with lysine residues and glycine residues with proline residues, which results in two shorter α-helices (linked by the substituted proline) that are more attuned to penetrating bacterial cell membranes.

== See also ==
- Exenatide
