= Sphaenorhynchus platycephalus =

South American lime treefrog

Conservation status
- Data Deficient (IUCN 3.1)

Scientific classification
- Kingdom: Animalia
- Phylum: Chordata
- Class: Amphibia
- Order: Anura
- Family: Hylidae
- Genus: Sphaenorhynchus
- Species: S. platycephalus

Binomial name
- Sphaenorhynchus platycephalus (Werner, 1894)

Synonyms
- Hylopsis platycephalus Werner, 1894; Hyla (Sphoenohyla) orophila Lutz and Lutz, 1938; Sphaenorhynchus orophilus (A. Lutz and B. Lutz 1938)

Species of amphibian

Sphaenorhynchus platycephalus, commonly known as the South American lime treefrog or Lutz's lime treefrog, is a species of frog in the family Hylidae. It is endemic to south-eastern Brazil where it occurs in the Serra do Mar and Serra da Mantiqueira ranges in the states of Rio de Janeiro, São Paulo, and Minas Gerais. However, Araujo-Vieira and colleagues suggests that the Serra da Mantiqueira population could represent Sphaenorhynchus canga; the two species are similar.

== Systematics ==
This species was originally described by Franz Werner in 1894 based on a specimen with no other collection information than its origin, "S. Amerika". In 1981 John D.Lynch designated a neotype for the species, erroneously believing that the holotype (the only known specimen, in the collections of the Institut für Zoologie der Universität Wien) was lost. However, the neotype specimen was not a hylid but a centrolenid, later described as a distinct species, Centrolenella savagei (now synonym of Ikakogi tayrona).

== Description ==
The holotype is a female, in poor condition of preservation. It measures 33 mm (1.3 in) in snout–vent length. The body is robust and the snout is rounded. The fingers are one-third and the toes four-fifths webbed. It is clearly distinct from other Sphaenorhynchus species. Adult males measure 29–32 mm (1.1–1.3 in) in snout–vent length. The snout is pointed or truncate-subovoid from above and acute in the lateral profile. The finger and toe tips bears discs; both the fingers and toes are moderately webbed. The dorsum is green. Black mottling or spots may or may not be present. The dorsolateral stripes are yellow above and black below. The ventrum is green or greenish yellow. Males have a single vocal sac.

== Habitat and conservation ==
Sphaenorhynchus platycephalus lives on vegetation above large ponds or lakes or at the edge of forests. Breeding takes place in relatively deep permanent ponds and lakes. It is threatened by drainage of its breeding habitat for mosquito control and the application of insecticides to kill mosquitoes. This practice also occurs within protected areas.
