= Lysapsus laevis =

Conservation status
- Least Concern (IUCN 3.1)

Scientific classification
- Kingdom: Animalia
- Phylum: Chordata
- Class: Amphibia
- Order: Anura
- Family: Hylidae
- Genus: Lysapsus
- Species: L. laevis

Binomial name
- Lysapsus laevis (Parker, 1935)

Synonyms
- Pseudis laevis Parker, 1935; Lysapsus limellus laevis (Parker, 1935)

Species of frog

Lysapsus laevis is a species of frog in the family Hylidae found in southwestern Guyana and adjacent northern Brazil. Common name Guyana harlequin frog has been coined for this species.

== Description ==
Adult are less than 30 mm (1.2 in) in body length.

The body is pale olive green from above, often with an irregular pattern of gray, brown, or black flecks. Some individuals have a rust or dark tan vertebral stripe. There are tiny cream dots around anal region and rear of thigh, and a cream stripe that can be broken on side of body. Arms are similar to body in colour but legs are paler, but with body colour bands. Chin and throat are pale green or greenish yellow with cream or yellow dots. Chest and abdomen are pale yellowish cream with white or cream dots extending toward the hind legs. Arms and legs are translucent from below.

== Habitat and conservation ==
Lysapsus laevis is an aquatic frog of open flooded savanna. It also occurs on floating meadows of large rivers. It breeds in the associated waterways.
