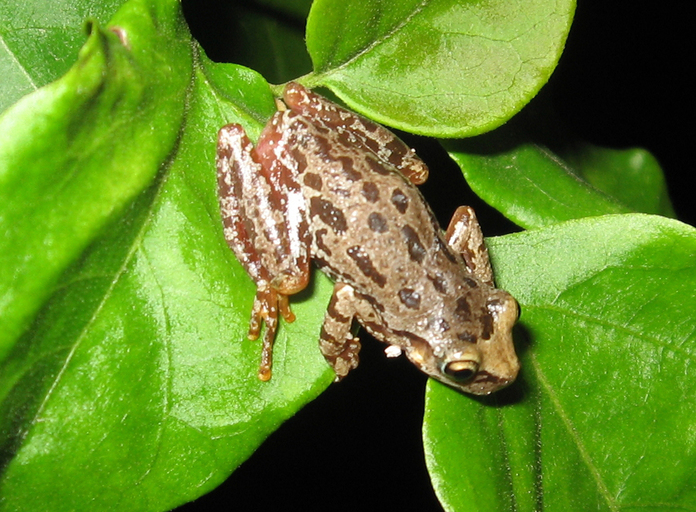
- Julianus uruguayus

Scientific classification
- Kingdom: Animalia
- Phylum: Chordata
- Class: Amphibia
- Order: Anura
- Family: Hylidae
- Tribe: Dendropsophini
- Genus: Julianus; Duellman, Marion & Hedges, 2016

Type species
- Scinax uruguayus (Schmidt, 1944)

Species
- Two species (see text)

= Julianus (frog) =

Genus of frogs

Julianus is a genus of tree frogs in the family Hylidae. Species of the genus are found in southeastern Brazil, Uruguay, and northeastern Argentina. This genus is considered poorly defined and is regarded by most to merely be a synonym of Scinax.

This genus is named after Julián Faivovich, who has contributed a notable amount of knowledge to the study of South American tree frogs. It was created because Scinax uruguayus differed from other Scinax in the larval oral disc morphology. More specifically, the tadpole has two keratinized and pigmented plates on the lower jaw sheath, along with the posterior marginal papillae being larger than the papillae on the lateral margins. The species Julianus pinimus was later added to this genus due to having similar features.

However, other papers claim that these frogs are not distinct enough to be grouped into an entirely different genus and should be readded to Scinax. This is because many of the characteristics used to define this genus are shared by other members of Scinax as well.

== Species ==
There are two species in the genus Julianus.

- Julianus uruguayus (Schmidt, 1944)
- Julianus pinimus (Bokermann & Sazima, 1973)

J. uruguayus is known from Treinta y Tres, Cerro Largo, and Tacuarembó in Uruguay, along with Santa Catarina, Brazil, and Corrientes, Argentina. It may also occur in parts of Paraguay, but this is unconfirmed. J. pinimus is only known from a single locality in Minas Gerais, Brazil.
