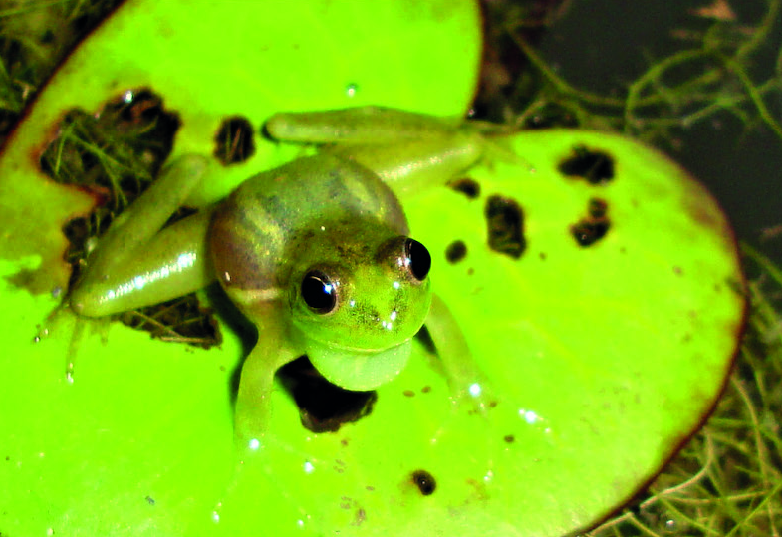
- Amapá, Brazil

Conservation status
- Data Deficient (IUCN 3.1)

Scientific classification
- Kingdom: Animalia
- Phylum: Chordata
- Class: Amphibia
- Order: Anura
- Family: Hylidae
- Genus: Lysapsus
- Species: L. bolivianus

Binomial name
- Lysapsus bolivianus Gallardo, 1961

Synonyms
- Lysapsus limellus bolivianus Gallardo, 1961; Pseudis boliviana (Gallardo, 1961)

= Lysapsus bolivianus =

Species of amphibian

Lysapsus bolivianus is a species of frog in the family Hylidae endemic to the Amazon valley in Bolivia and Brazil.
