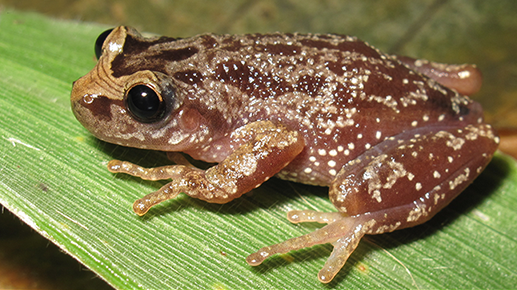

Conservation status
- Least Concern (IUCN 3.1)

Scientific classification
- Kingdom: Animalia
- Phylum: Chordata
- Class: Amphibia
- Order: Anura
- Family: Hylidae
- Genus: Julianus
- Species: J. pinimus

Binomial name
- Julianus pinimus (Bokermann & Sazima, 1973)

Synonyms
- Scinax pinima (Bokermann & Sazima, 1973)

= Julianus pinimus =

Species of frog

Julianus pinimus is a species of frog in the family Hylidae. It is endemic to Brazil. Its natural habitats are moist savanna, subtropical or tropical moist shrubland, subtropical or tropical high-altitude shrubland, subtropical or tropical dry lowland grassland, swamps, and intermittent freshwater marshes. It is threatened by habitat loss.
