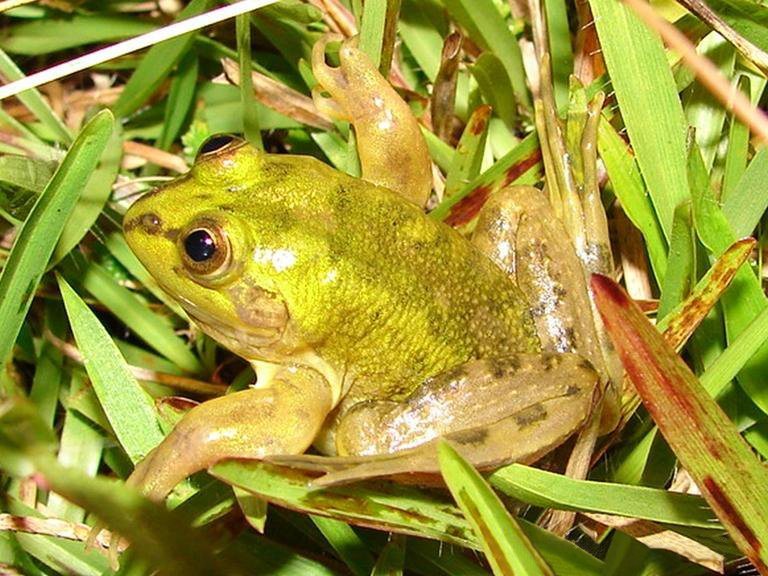

Conservation status
- Least Concern (IUCN 3.1)

Scientific classification
- Kingdom: Animalia
- Phylum: Chordata
- Class: Amphibia
- Order: Anura
- Family: Hylidae
- Genus: Pseudis
- Species: P. cardosoi

Binomial name
- Pseudis cardosoi Kwet, 2000

Synonyms
- Podonectes cardosoi (Kwet, 2000)

= Pseudis cardosoi =

Species of amphibian

Pseudis cardosoi is a species of aquatic frog in the family Hylidae. It is endemic to southern Brazil and is known from the states of Rio Grande do Sul, Santa Catarina, and Paraná. The specific name cardosoi honors Adão José Cardoso, a Brazilian herpetologist.

== Description ==
Males measure 22–46 mm (0.9–1.8 in) and females 30–57 mm (1.2–2.2 in) in snout–vent length. The body is robust. The head is broad and the snout is rounded. The tympanum is distinct. The forearms are robust with robust fingers; no webbing is present. The hind limbs are short and robust with extensively webbed toes. The body and the limbs are dorsally light to dark green, olive, or brownish. There are usually some darker spots or blotches of irregular form. A black or dark green stripe runs along the canthus rostralis; it can be narrow or broad and blot-like. The tympanum is olive, tan or light brown. The lateral surfaces of head, body, and thigh are light yellow. Ventral surfaces are white. Males have paired vocal sac.

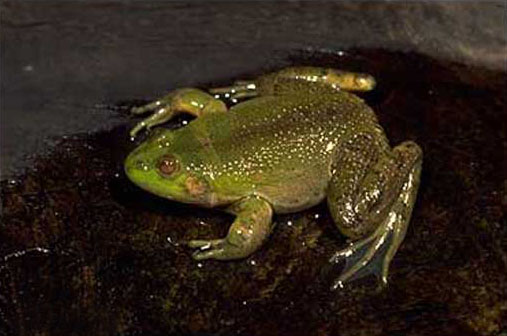

The male advertisement call is loud, modulated, and variable, resembling the grunting of a pig.

Three tadpoles in Gosner stages 34–37 measured 79–87 mm (3.1–3.4 in). Of this, the ovoid body made little more than one third. The tail is higher than the body but ends with a flagelliform tip.

== Habitat and ecology ==
Pseudis cardosoi is strictly aquatic and typically occurs in permanent pasture ponds and still-water pools of slowly flowing creeks at elevations of 700–1,200 m (2,300–3,900 ft) above sea level. It appears to be a diet generalist. The diet consists of mostly insects (mainly Diptera, Coleoptera, Hymenoptera, and Hemiptera) and plant matter. Whether the plant matter is accidentally ingested or represents a supplementary source of nutrition is unknown. Arthropods other than insects and other invertebrates are sometimes present.

Breeding activity has been observed through the warmer season, when temperature exceeds 8–10°C. Tadpoles can be found throughout the year, reflecting their long development time. Males call during both day and night, floating on the water surface. The eggs are deposited singly or in small clumps and fixed to submerged plants. The total clutch size of four amplectant pairs was 70 to 189 eggs. The egg diameter is 2.5–3.0 mm (0.10–0.12 in).

== Conservation ==
Pseudis cardosoi is a common species that is not facing major threats. It is present in the Aparados de Serra and Serra Geral National Parks. Nevertheless, its ability to colonize new habitat appears limited: two formerly inhabited ponds that dried out did not become recolonized within the next three years, despite their proximity to other inhabited ponds.
