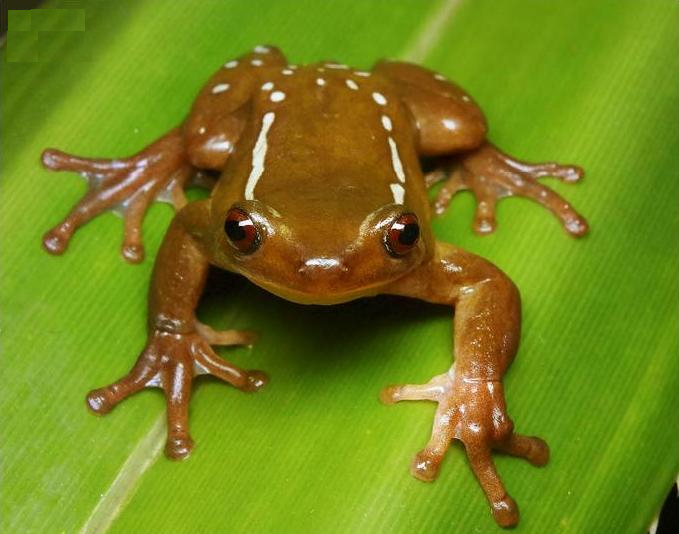
- Found in Brazil

Scientific classification
- Kingdom: Animalia
- Phylum: Chordata
- Class: Amphibia
- Order: Anura
- Family: Hylidae
- Tribe: Dendropsophini
- Genus: Xenohyla; Izecksohn, 1998

Type species
- Hyla truncata Izecksohn, 1959

Species
- 2 species (see text)

= Xenohyla =

Genus of amphibians

Xenohyla is a genus of tree frogs in the family Hylidae that is endemic to xeric habitats of coastal Brazil, with Xenohyla eugenioi native to the State of Bahia and the State of Sergipe, and Xenohyla truncata native to the State of Rio de Janeiro. This genus is characterized by a robust body, wide flat head, short snout, short forelimbs with muscular forearms, and a truncate-shaped body when viewed from above. They are associated with bromeliads, where they hide during the day and eat the insects that also inhabit the plant. They breed in temporary pools that are formed by rainwater. Both species are orange or brown with a white stripe going down their dorsal edges. X. truncata loses this stripe when it matures but X. eugenioi keeps it as an adult.

Xenohyla truncata is unique in the fact that it is the only known frugivorous amphibian. It locates fruit and swallows it whole, and is known to defecate out viable seeds that help in the spread of the plant. The arthropod to plant ratio in their diet depends on the month, with some months consisting mainly of fruits and other plant material, while other months when plants are not fruiting the frog mainly eats various types of arthropods. It is currently unknown whether or not Xenohyla eugenioi is frugivorous as well.

The genus name comes from Ancient Greek xeno (ξένος meaning "strange" or "alien") and hyla (ὕλη meaning "wood" or "forest") which is used for tree frogs, so the genus name means "strange tree frog." Xenohyla truncata means "strange truncated tree frog" after the shape of its body. Xenohyla eugenioi is named after Brazilian herpetologist Eugênio Izecksohn who described the genus and type species, and the name means "Eugênio's strange tree frog."

== Species ==
- Xenohyla eugenioi (Caramaschi, 1998)
- Xenohyla truncata (Izecksohn, 1959) — Izecksohn's Brazilian treefrog
