= Sphaenorhynchus canga =

Scientific classification
- Domain: Eukaryota
- Kingdom: Animalia
- Phylum: Chordata
- Class: Amphibia
- Order: Anura
- Family: Hylidae
- Genus: Sphaenorhynchus
- Species: S. canga

Binomial name
- Sphaenorhynchus canga Araujo-Vieira, Lacerda, Pezzuti, Leite, Assis, and Cruz, 2015

Species of frog

Sphaenorhynchus canga is a frog in the family Hylidae. It is endemic to Minas Gerais, Brazil.

The adult male frog measures 26.2–30.2 mm in snout-vent length. It has a white line from each eye all the way down its body. It has a dark line from its nose to past the eye. The skin on the frog's back is light green in color with dark, irregular spots. It has lighter brown spots on its limbs. There are iridescent lines on its face and sides. The ventrum is light green. Its skin is translucenct, leaving the muscles, blood vessels, and green bones visible. The iris of the eye is gold in color with brown reticulation.

Scientists have seen this frog in permanent bodies of water and semi-permanent bodies of water, less often in temporary bodies of water. The male frog sings for the female frog while sitting on floating vegetation.

Scientists have seen this frog on ironstone outcrops called "canga".
