= Sphaenorhynchus caramaschii =

Conservation status
- Least Concern (IUCN 3.1)

Scientific classification
- Kingdom: Animalia
- Phylum: Chordata
- Class: Amphibia
- Order: Anura
- Family: Hylidae
- Genus: Sphaenorhynchus
- Species: S. caramaschii

Binomial name
- Sphaenorhynchus caramaschii Toledo, Garcia, Lingnau, and Haddad, 2007

Species of amphibian

Sphaenorhynchus caramaschii, the lime treefrog, is a species of frog in the family Hylidae. It is endemic to Brazil, where it is found in the states of São Paulo, Paraná, and Santa Catarina.
