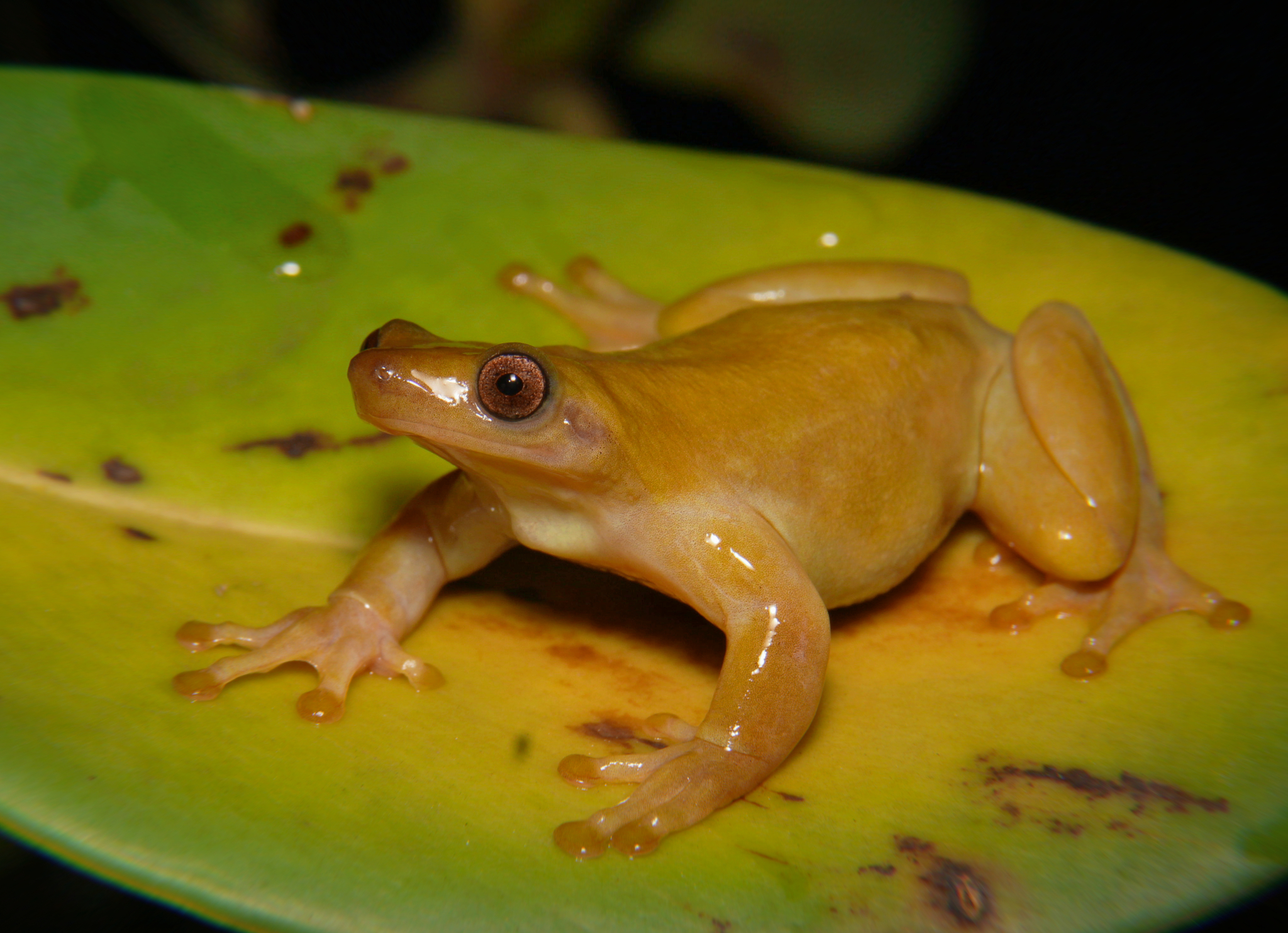

Conservation status
- Vulnerable (IUCN 3.1)

Scientific classification
- Kingdom: Animalia
- Phylum: Chordata
- Class: Amphibia
- Order: Anura
- Family: Hylidae
- Genus: Xenohyla
- Species: X. truncata

Binomial name
- Xenohyla truncata (Izecksohn, 1998)
- Extant (resident)

Synonyms
- Hyla truncata Izecksohn, 1959; Hyla depressa Izecksohn, 1959

= Xenohyla truncata =

Izecksohn's Brazilian tree frog

Species of amphibian

Xenohyla truncata, the Izecksohn's Brazilian treefrog, is a species of frugivorous tree frog in the family Hylidae. It is endemic to the State of Rio de Janeiro, Brazil.

The range of this frog ranges from the southern border of Espírito Santo down to Ilha da Marambaia, inhabiting mostly restingas near the coast and on some islands. They shelter inside bromeliads such as Neoregelia cruenta during the day and breed in temporary pools. When disturbed, this tree frog will tilt its head down, outstretch its legs, and puff up. This posture breaks up the frogs outline and makes it appear larger. These tree frogs are listed as near threatened because they are restricted to an area of less than 20,000 square kilometres and because human development modifies or destroys their restinga habitats. As a juvenile, Xenohyla truncata has white stripes down the sides of its body but they disappear at maturity, leaving the adult frog a uniform brown or orange.

This species of frog is unique in that it is the only known frugivorous frog in the world. This frog will eat various types of plants, including Anthurium harrisii, Erythroxylum ovalifolium, and Maytenus obtusifolia. Inside the stomach contents of Xenohyla truncata were found many different types of arthropods, fruits, seeds, pods, pulp and flowers. The amount of plant material eaten by the frog likely depends on the blooming and fruiting periods of the plants, with various types of arthropods eaten instead when plants are unavailable. The frog will locate the fruit and simply snap at it, swallowing it whole. The frog has been found to defecate viable seeds and likely helps in the spread of the plants it consumes.

The plants Erythroxylum ovalifolium and Maytenus obtusifolia both contain toxic alkaloids and terpenes, and Xenohyla truncata has been found to excrete from its skin the chemical compound N-phenyl-acetamide, which is capable of causing liver and kidney damage in vertebrates. Several of the arthropods consumed by the frog have been found to inhabit bromeliads. These arthropods are cockroach larvae, dragonfly larvae, and crab spiders. This suggests that the bromeliads not only provide cover during the day, but also a food source. Sand has also been found in the digestive tract, meaning that the frog forages on the ground.

== Pollination ==
This is the first amphibian to have been observed pollinating plants, Cordia taguahyensis (Boraginaceae) and Iris x germanica (Iridaceae).
