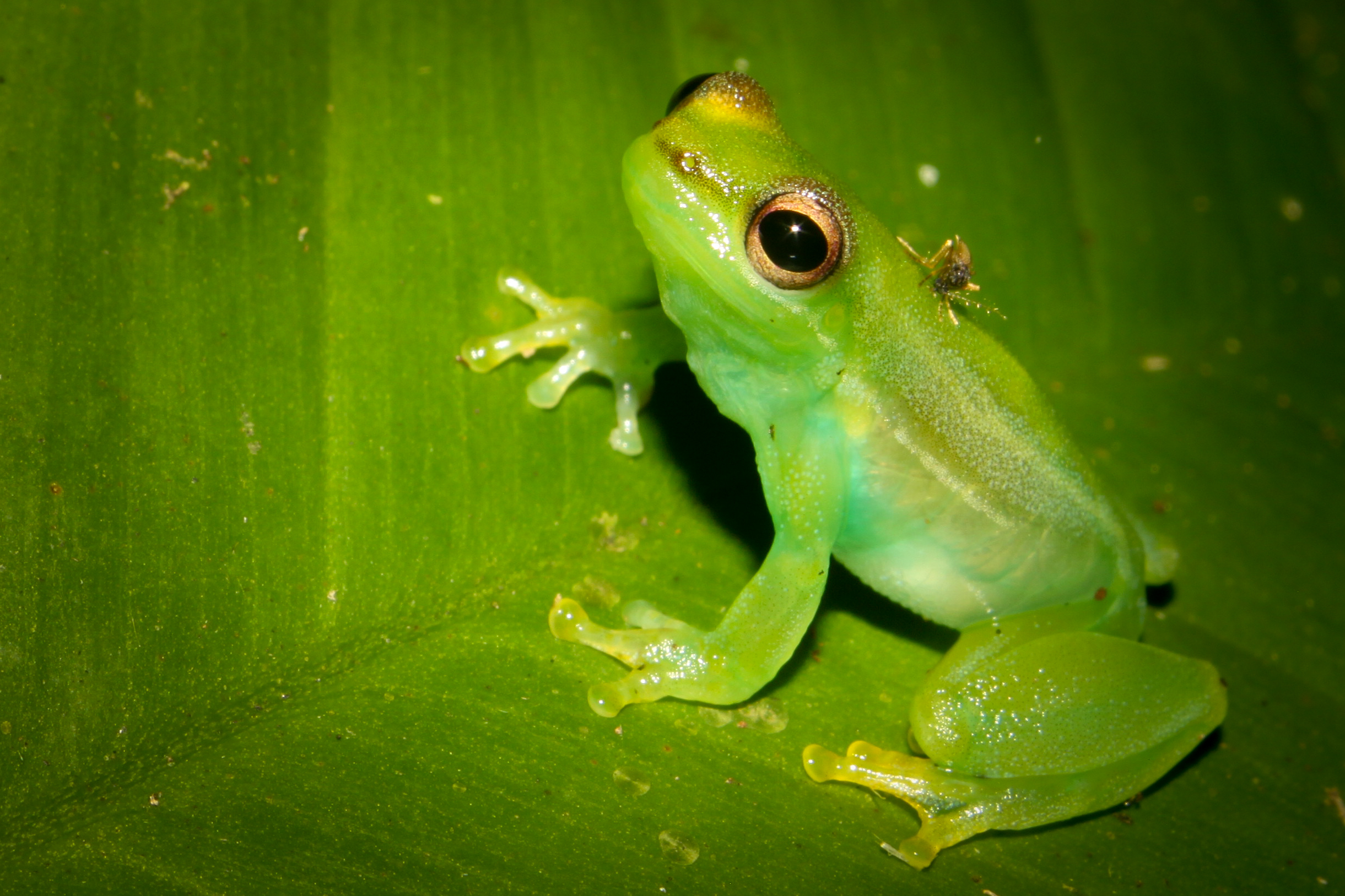

Conservation status
- Data Deficient (IUCN 3.1)

Scientific classification
- Kingdom: Animalia
- Phylum: Chordata
- Class: Amphibia
- Order: Anura
- Family: Hylidae
- Genus: Sphaenorhynchus
- Species: S. pauloalvini

Binomial name
- Sphaenorhynchus pauloalvini Bokermann, 1973

= Sphaenorhynchus pauloalvini =

Paulo's lime treefrog

Species of amphibian

Sphaenorhynchus pauloalvini, or Paulo's lime treefrog, is a species of frog in the family Hylidae. It is endemic to eastern Brazil and is known from two locations in Bahia, Itabuna (its type locality) and Una.

== Habitat and conservation ==
Sphaenorhynchus pauloalvini lives near on in ponds. It is threatened by habitat loss. It has not been recorded in the area of its type locality after its original description in 1973. However, another population was discovered in Una in 2007.
