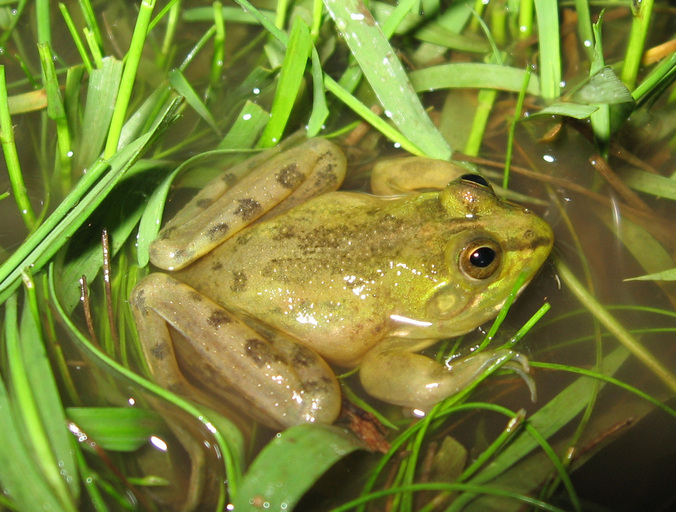

Conservation status
- Least Concern (IUCN 3.1)

Scientific classification
- Kingdom: Animalia
- Phylum: Chordata
- Class: Amphibia
- Order: Anura
- Family: Hylidae
- Genus: Pseudis
- Species: P. minuta

Binomial name
- Pseudis minuta Günther, 1858

Synonyms
- Lysapsus mantidactyla Cope, 1862; Pseudis brasiliensis Peters, 1863; Pseudis mantidactyla — Boulenger, 1882; Pseudis meridionalis Miranda-Ribeiro, 1926; Pseudis minutus — Savage and Carvalho, 1953; Lysapsus mantidactylus — Gallardo, 1961; Podonectes minutus — Garda and Cannatella, 2007

= Pseudis minuta =

Species of amphibian

Pseudis minuta (common name: lesser swimming frog) is a species of aquatic frog in the family Hylidae. It is found in northeastern Argentina, Uruguay, and southern Brazil, and is likely to be found in southern Paraguay.

== Description ==
Males measure 24–39 mm (0.9–1.5 in) and females 39–51 mm (1.5–2.0 in) in snout–vent length. The snout is truncate in lateral profile. The fingers are slender. Hind limbs are relatively long and slender. Dorsal coloration is light green or brownish, usually with small dark blotches; sometimes a distinct light middorsal band is present. A light longitudinal stripe runs through most of the flank. The thighs have usually three distinct stripes.

Males call mostly during the night, floating on the water surface and holding to vegetation. They may also call from leaves of water hyacinths, with body completely out of water. The call repertoire consists of an advertisement call and two different aggressive calls. Male–male agonistic interactions involve both advertisement and aggressive calls, and may also involve wrestling.

== Habitat and conservation ==
Pseudis minuta is a very common, aquatic frog found in ponds and still-water pools of slowly moving creeks at elevations below 500 m (1,600 ft) above sea level. It can also thrive in rice plantations. There are no known major threats, at it even appears to tolerate environments (i.e., rice plantations) that receive heavy doses of pesticides. It is present in several protected areas.
