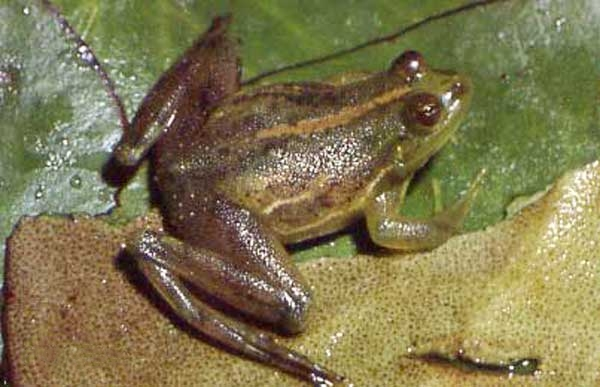

Conservation status
- Least Concern (IUCN 3.1)

Scientific classification
- Kingdom: Animalia
- Phylum: Chordata
- Class: Amphibia
- Order: Anura
- Family: Hylidae
- Genus: Lysapsus
- Species: L. limellum

Binomial name
- Lysapsus limellum Cope, 1862

Synonyms
- Lysapsus limellus Cope, 1862 (incorrect spelling); Pseudis limellum (Cope, 1862)

= Lysapsus limellum =

Species of frog

Lysapsus limellum, sometimes known as the Uruguay harlequin frog, is a species of frog in the family Hylidae.

== Description ==
Females have a snout-vent length of 16.2–24.8 mm (0.64–0.98 in), while males have a snout-vent length of only 15.2–21.0 mm (0.60–0.83 in). L. limellum can show a variety of colors from pale green to dark brown-green, while its eyes are typically golden. Individuals can have patterns, but one pattern is not universal to the species.

== Life cycle ==
Tadpoles of L. limellum can grow to be as long as 40 mm (tail & body), and 11 mm (body). Tails in old tadpoles can have a black tip, possibly to make predators attack their tail instead of their body. Predators to the tadpoles consist of aquatic insects, while predators to the full-grown L. limellum consist of fish and large invertebrates.

== Reproduction ==
L. limellum does not have a breeding season, and instead they breed year-round. Males call atop floating vegetation throughout the day, though during the day they are more active and call less, whereas in the night they are less active and call more. Males have two calls; one likely an advertisement call, while the other is a social call. They lay clutches of 10 - 182 eggs.

== Distribution ==
Found in northern Argentina, Bolivia, Brazil, Paraguay, and Uruguay. Its natural habitats are moist savanna, subtropical or tropical seasonally wet or flooded lowland grassland, rivers, swamps, freshwater lakes, freshwater marshes, and pastureland. It is locally impacted by habitat loss.
