= Sphaenorhynchus palustris =

Linhares lime treefrog

Conservation status
- Least Concern (IUCN 3.1)

Scientific classification
- Kingdom: Animalia
- Phylum: Chordata
- Class: Amphibia
- Order: Anura
- Family: Hylidae
- Genus: Sphaenorhynchus
- Species: S. palustris

Binomial name
- Sphaenorhynchus palustris Bokermann, 1966

Species of amphibian

Sphaenorhynchus palustris, the Linhares lime treefrog, is a species of frog in the family Hylidae. It is endemic to eastern Brazil and known from its type locality, Linhares in Espírito Santo, and from Bahia north to Praia do Forte.

Sphaenorhynchus palustris is a very aquatic frog that is almost always found in small temporary and permanent pools or ponds at the borders of forests close to sea level. Breeding takes place in temporary and permanent pools. Habitat loss from agriculture, wood plantations, livestock grazing, logging, and human settlement is a threat to it. It occurs in several protected areas.
