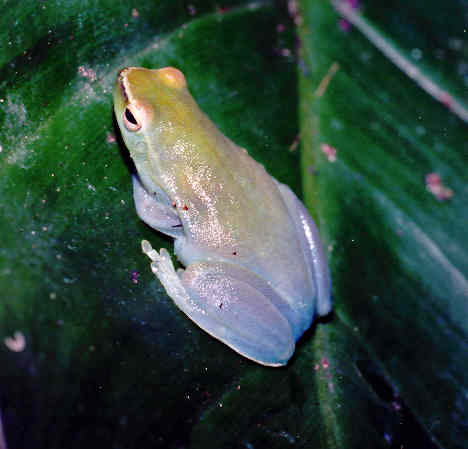

Conservation status
- Least Concern (IUCN 3.1)

Scientific classification
- Kingdom: Animalia
- Phylum: Chordata
- Class: Amphibia
- Order: Anura
- Family: Hylidae
- Genus: Sphaenorhynchus
- Species: S. lacteus

Binomial name
- Sphaenorhynchus lacteus (Daudin, 1800)

Synonyms
- Hyla lactea Daudin, 1800; Hyla lactea Daudin, 1801; Rana aurantia Shaw, 1802; Hyla aurantiaca Daudin, 1802; Sphaenorhynchus eurhostus Rivero, 1969

= Sphaenorhynchus lacteus =

Species of amphibian

Sphaenorhynchus lacteus, the Orinoco lime treefrog, is a species of frog in the family Hylidae. It is a widely distributed species found in the Orinoco and Amazon basins in Venezuela, the Guianas (Guyana, Suriname, French Guiana), Colombia, Brazil, Ecuador, Peru, and Bolivia. It also occurs in Trinidad and Tobago.

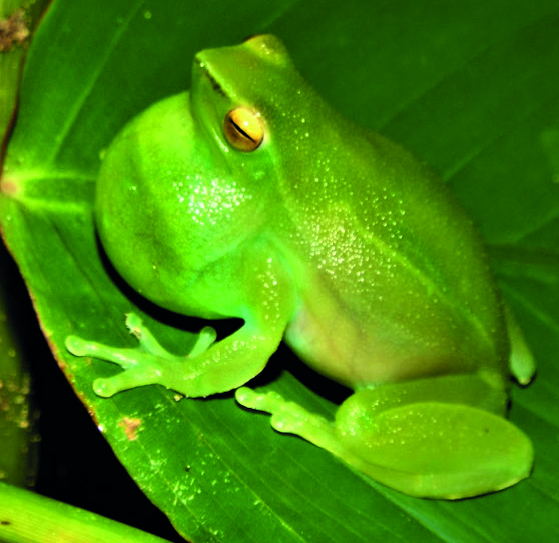
Amapá, Brazil

== Description ==
Adult males measure 26–42 mm (1.0–1.7 in) and females 38–46 mm (1.5–1.8 in) in snout–vent length.

The snout is pointed in dorsal view and angles sharply back when viewed laterally. The tympanum is visible. The fingers are one-half to two-thirds webbed whereas the toes are fully webbed. The dorsum is bright green with dark brown canthal stripe. The venter and outer margins of the limbs are white whereas the ventral surfaces of the limbs are bluish green. The iris is pale creamy bronze.

== Habitat and conservation ==
Sphaenorhynchus lacteus is a semi-aquatic frog found in flooded plains, floating meadows, ponds, and large lagoons in forest clearings, at forest edges, and in savanna. It has also been recorded in leaf litter in tropical rainforest, in seasonally flooded agricultural land, and flooded roadside ditches. It occurs at elevations to 300 m (980 ft) above sea level. Males call from floating vegetation and emergent grasses at night.

Sphaenorhynchus lacteus is a common species through most of its range. It can locally be threatened by habitat loss and pollution. Its range includes several protected areas. It can be found in the pet trade.
