= Coleman Jett Goin =

American herpetologist (1911–1986)

- Born: February 25, 1911; Gainesville, Florida, U.S.
- Died: May 12, 1986 (aged 75); Flagstaff, Arizona, U.S.
- Education: University of Pittsburgh; University of Florida (B.Sc., M.Sc., Ph.D.)
- Known for: Amphibian systematics, popular and academic herpetological literature
- Spouse: Olive Lynda Bown Goin
- Scientific career
- Fields: Herpetology
- Workplaces: University of Florida; Museum of Northern Arizona
- Doctoral advisor: James Speed Rogers

Coleman Jett Goin (February 25, 1911 – May 12, 1986) was an American herpetologist.

== Biography ==
Goin was born in Gainesville, Florida in 1911. He began his higher education in 1935 at the University of Pittsburgh, and later transferred to the University of Florida, where he earned a B.Sc. in 1939 and an M.Sc. in 1941. He completed his Ph.D. in 1946 under limnologist James Speed Rogers.

His interest in herpetology began during his time at the University of Pittsburgh, where he volunteered at the Carnegie Museum of Natural History. He continued working at the museum every summer during his academic studies.

In 1956, Goin joined the University of Florida as a zoology assistant and later became a professor. He retired in 1971, after which he moved to Flagstaff, Arizona, where he collaborated with the Museum of Northern Arizona.

Goin specialized in amphibians and conducted extensive fieldwork despite suffering long-term effects from poliomyelitis. He published nearly 120 scientific papers and described several taxa. He also co-authored several influential books on herpetology, often collaborating with Archie Carr, Doris Mable Cochran, and his wife Olive Lynda Bown Goin.

He held several leadership roles in the American Society of Ichthyologists and Herpetologists, serving as Vice President (1942–1946), Treasurer (1952–1957), and President (1966).

== Eponyms ==
The Guaniguanico yellow-mottled frog (Eleutherodactylus goini) is named in honor of Coleman Goin, and the Tarauaca snouted treefrog (Scarthyla goinorum) is named in honor of Coleman and Lynda Goin.

== Selected publications ==
- 1947 – Studies on the life history of Eleutherodactylus ricordii planirostris (Cope) in Florida, with special reference to the local distribution of an allelomorphic color pattern. University of Florida Press, Gainesville.
- 1955 – With Walter Auffenberg, The fossil salamanders of the family Sirenidae. The Museum, Cambridge.
- 1958 – With Walter Auffenberg, New salamanders of the family Sirenidae from the Cretaceous of North America. Chicago Natural History Museum.
- 1959 – With Archie Carr, Guide to the reptiles, amphibians and fresh-water fishes of Florida. University of Florida Press, Gainesville.
- 1960 – Pattern variation in the frog Eleutherodactylus nubicola Dunn. University of Florida Press, Gainesville.
- 1961 – With Doris Mable Cochran, A new genus and species of frog (Leptodactylidae) from Colombia. Chicago Natural History Museum.
- 1962 – With Olive Lynda Bown Goin, Introduction to Herpetology. W. H. Freeman, San Francisco. (Revised editions in 1971 and 1978, with George R. Zug).
- 1963 – Two new genera of leptodactylid frogs from Colombia. San Francisco.
- 1965 – With Olive Lynda Bown Goin, Comparative Vertebrate Anatomy. Barnes & Noble, New York.
- 1970 – With Olive Lynda Bown Goin, Man and the Natural World: An Introduction to Life Science. Macmillan, New York. (Revised 1975).
- 1970 – With Doris M. Cochran, The New Field Book of Reptiles and Amphibians: More than 200 Photographs and Diagrams. Putnam, New York.
- 1974 – With Olive Lynda Bown Goin, Journey onto Land. Macmillan, New York.
