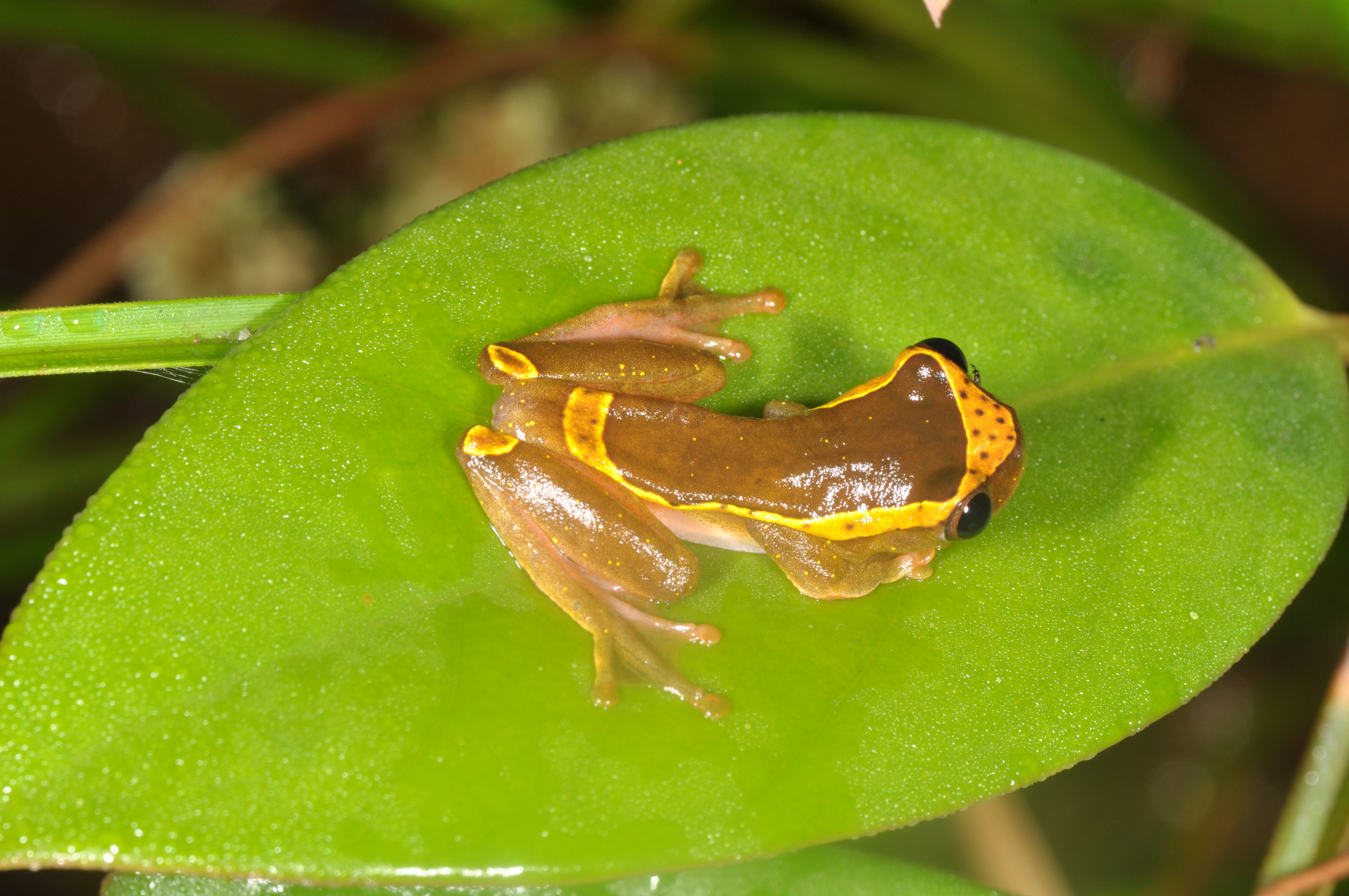

Conservation status
- Least Concern (IUCN 3.1)

Scientific classification
- Kingdom: Animalia
- Phylum: Chordata
- Class: Amphibia
- Order: Anura
- Family: Hylidae
- Genus: Dendropsophus
- Species: D. bifurcus

Binomial name
- Dendropsophus bifurcus (Andersson, 1945)

= Dendropsophus bifurcus =

Species of frog

Dendropsophus bifurcus, commonly known as the Upper Amazon treefrog, is a species of frog in the family Hylidae. It is found in the upper Amazon Basin of Bolivia, Brazil, Colombia, Ecuador, and Peru. Dendropsophus bifurcus is an abundant and widespread species that inhabits bushes in open forest and clearings. It breeds in permanent and temporary shallow ponds. Eggs are laid out of the water on leaves whereas the tadpoles develop in the water.
