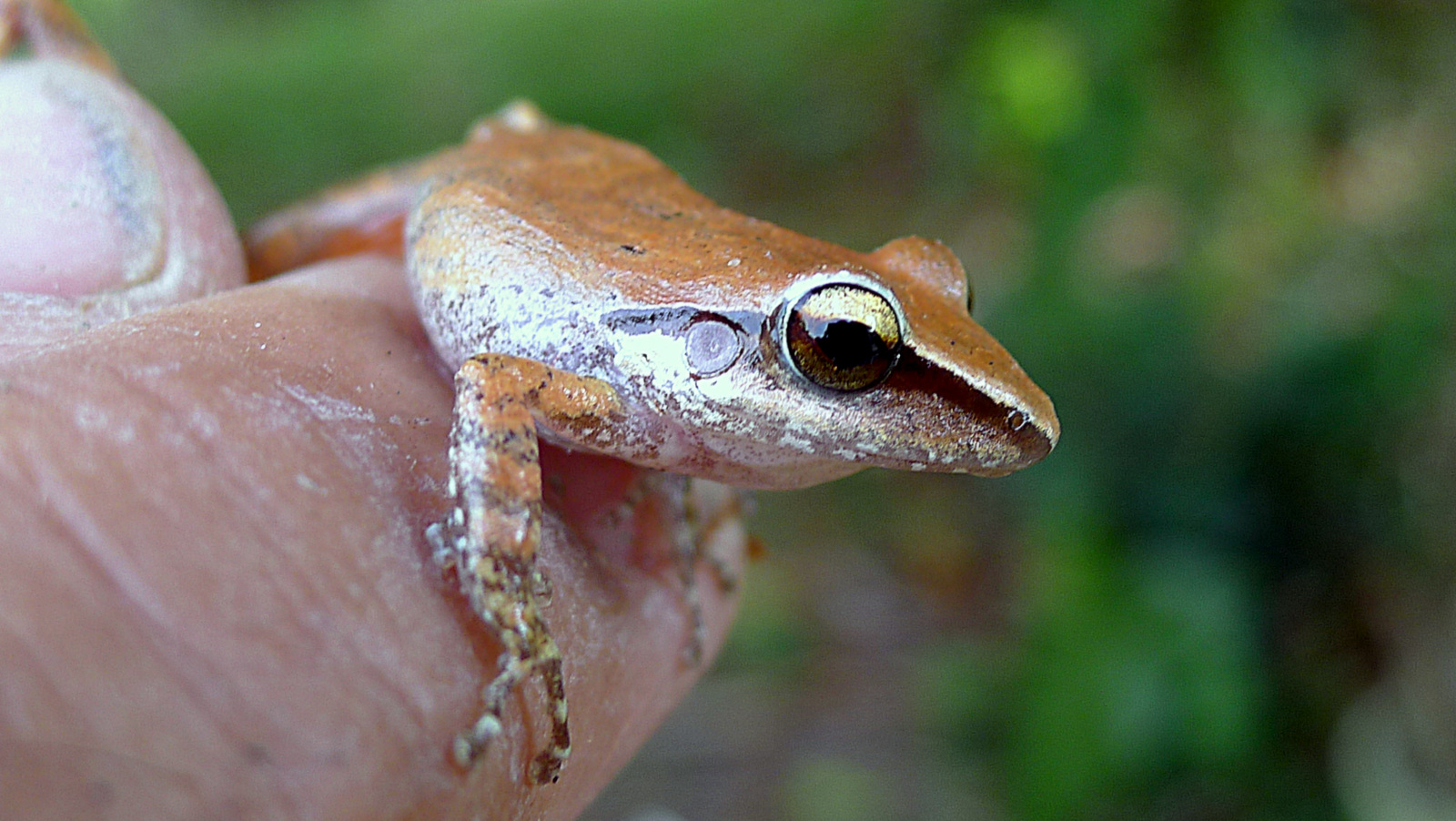

Conservation status
- Least Concern (IUCN 3.1)

Scientific classification
- Kingdom: Animalia
- Phylum: Chordata
- Class: Amphibia
- Order: Anura
- Family: Strabomantidae
- Genus: Pristimantis
- Species: P. paulodutrai

Binomial name
- Pristimantis paulodutrai (Bokermann, 1975)

Synonyms
- Eleutherodactylus paulodutrai Bokermann, 1975; Ischnocnema paulodutrai (Bokermann, 1975)

= Pristimantis paulodutrai =

Species of amphibian

Pristimantis paulodutrai, also known as Paulo's robber frog, is a species of frog in the family Strabomantidae and was formerly placed in the "wastebin genus" Eleutherodactylus. It is endemic to the Atlantic forest of eastern Brazil, from southern Bahia north to Alagoas.

Pristimantis paulodutrai is a very common frog living on low vegetation inside primary and secondary forest (up to 130m above sea level). It is listed as "Least Concern" by the IUCN because of its wide distribution, tolerance of habitat modification, presumed large population, and the unlikelihood of imminent rapid population decline.
