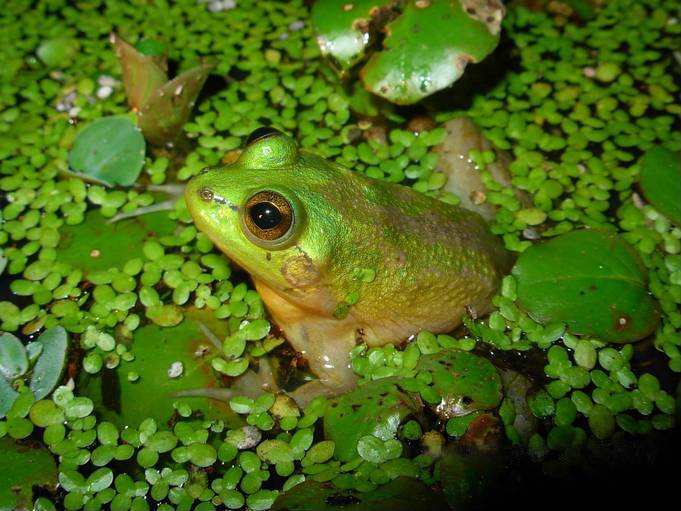

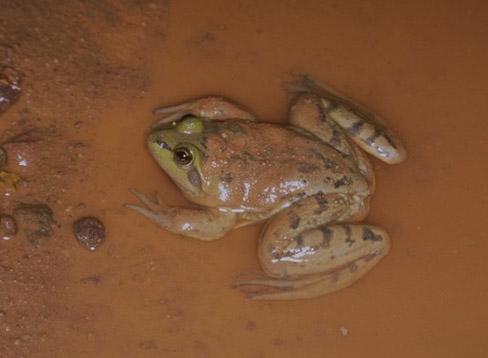
- Two colour variants: above – Mana, French Guiana below – Apure, Venezuela

Conservation status
- Least Concern (IUCN 3.1)

Scientific classification
- Kingdom: Animalia
- Phylum: Chordata
- Class: Amphibia
- Order: Anura
- Family: Hylidae
- Genus: Pseudis
- Species: P. paradoxa

Binomial name
- Pseudis paradoxa (Linnaeus, 1758)

= Pseudis paradoxa =

Species of amphibian

Pseudis paradoxa, known as the paradoxical frog or shrinking frog, is a species of hylid frog from South America. Its name refers to the very large—up to 27 cm (11 in) long—tadpole (the world's longest), which in turn "shrinks" during metamorphosis into an ordinary-sized frog, only about a quarter or third of its former length. Although the recordholder was a tadpole in Amapá that belonged to this species, others in the genus Pseudis also have large tadpoles and ordinary-sized adults.

== Distribution and habitat ==
The species inhabits ponds, lakes, lagoons and similar waters from the Amazon and the Guianas, to Venezuela and Trinidad, with a disjunct distribution in the Magdalena River watershed in Colombia and adjacent far western Venezuela. More southerly populations from the Pantanal region to northeastern Argentina have been recognized as a subspecies, but are now often considered a full species, P. platensis, although the validity of this split is questionable.

== Appearance and behavior ==
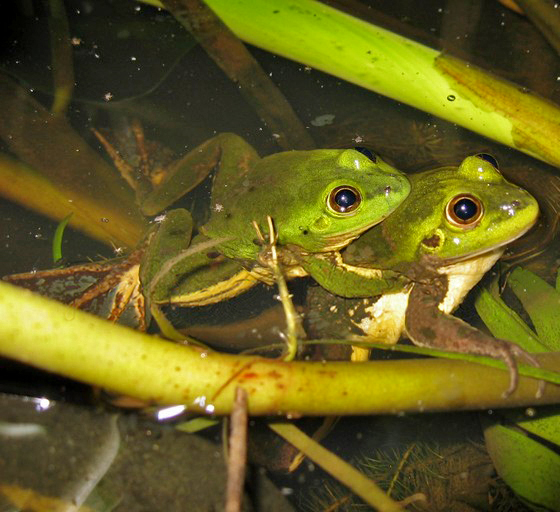
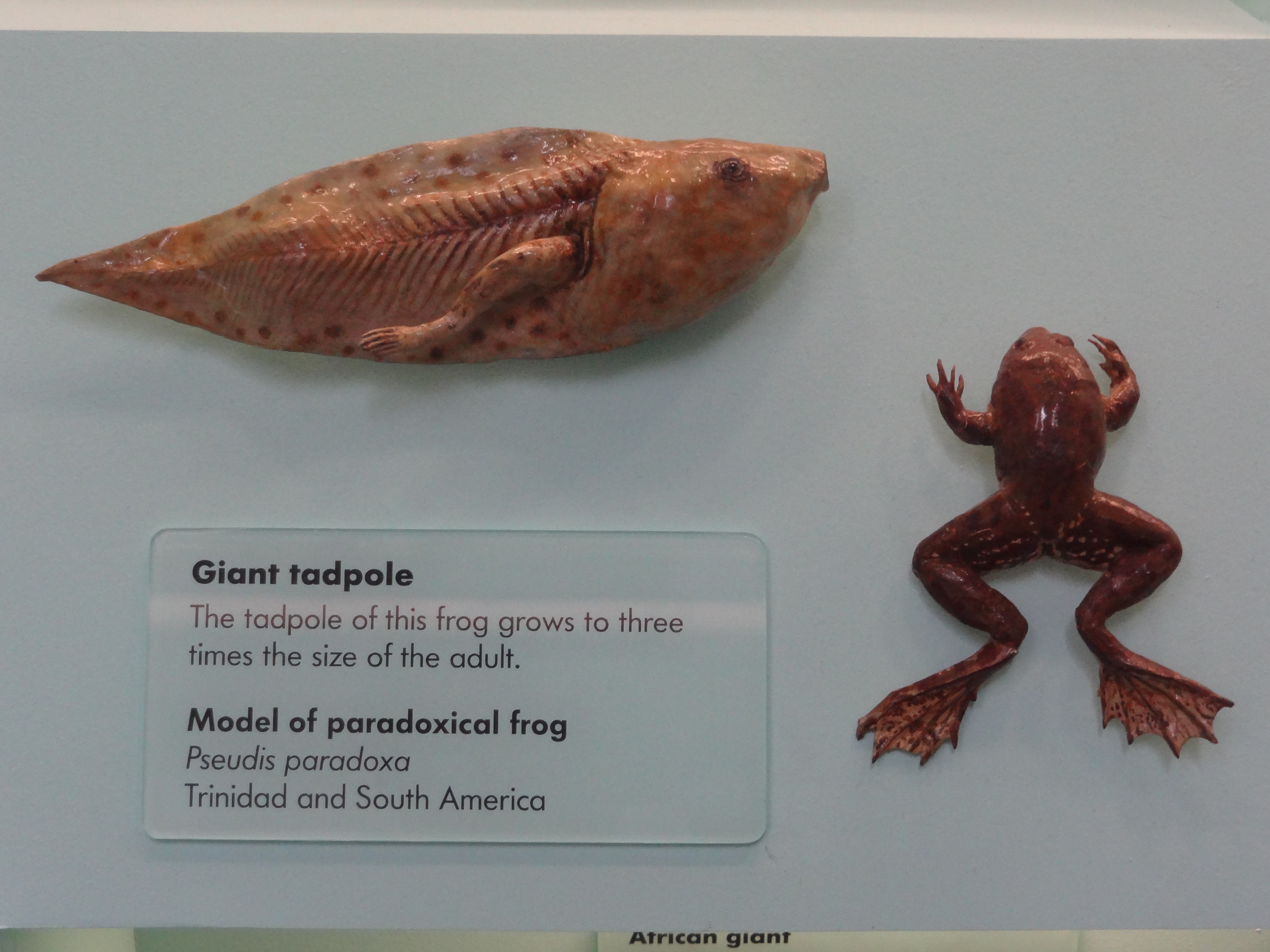
Mating pair in São Paulo, Brazil (left), models of full-grown tadpole and adult frog (right)

The adult frogs of P. paradoxa have a snout–to–vent length of 3.4–7.6 cm (1.3–3.0 in) and are green to brown coloured with dark green, olive or dark brownish stripes or mottling; the pattern and hue varies significantly.

The female of P. paradoxa lay eggs among water plants; the eggs develop into tadpoles. They always reach a large size, but there are noticeable local variations in the final size of the tadpoles, with those in large temporary waters with plenty of food and few aquatic predators growing larger than those in smaller waters with less food or waters with more aquatic predators.

The tadpoles feed mostly on algae. The adult frogs, which are active both day and night and always in or near water, eat insects (such as flies, beetles, true bugs, plantsuckers, butterflies, moths and dragonflies) and other invertebrates (such as crabs), and small frogs. When threatened, the frog uses its strong toes with an extra joint to stir up the muddy bottom and hide. The frog also uses this mechanism to find food on the bottom of lakes and ponds.

== Potential use in medicine ==
In March 2008, scientists working from the Universities of Ulster and United Arab Emirates released findings of a study on pseudin-2, a skin compound which protects the paradoxical frog from infection. This work found that a synthetic version of this compound was able to stimulate the secretion of insulin in pancreatic cells under laboratory conditions without toxicity to the cells. As such, this synthetic medicine could be used in the treatment of Type 2 diabetes.
