= Scarthyla goinorum =

Conservation status
- Least Concern (IUCN 3.1)

Scientific classification
- Kingdom: Animalia
- Phylum: Chordata
- Class: Amphibia
- Order: Anura
- Family: Hylidae
- Genus: Scarthyla
- Species: S. goinorum

Binomial name
- Scarthyla goinorum (Bokermann, 1962)

Synonyms
- Hyla goinorum Bokermann, 1962; Ololygon goinorum — Fouquette & Delahoussaye, 1977; Scarthyla ostinodactyla Duellman & de Sá, 1988; Scinax goinorum — Duellman & Wiens, 1992; Scarthyla goinorum — De la Riva, 2000

Species of frog

Scarthyla goinorum, also known commonly as the Madre de Dios treefrog and the Tarauaca snouted treefrog, is a species of frog in the family Hylidae. The species is endemic to South America.

== Etymology ==
The specific name, goinorum (genitive plural), is in honor of American herpetologists Coleman J. Goin and Olive B. Goin, who were husband and wife.

== Geographic range ==
Scarthyla goinorum is found in Bolivia, Brazil, Colombia, and Peru.

== Habitat ==
The natural habitats of Scarthyla goinorum are subtropical or tropical moist lowland forests, rivers, and intermittent rivers.

== Conservation status ==
Scarthyla goinorum is threatened by habitat loss.
