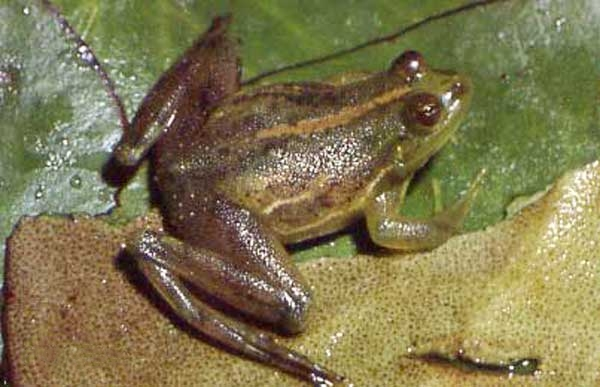
- Lysapsus limellum

Scientific classification
- Kingdom: Animalia
- Phylum: Chordata
- Class: Amphibia
- Order: Anura
- Family: Hylidae
- Tribe: Dendropsophini
- Genus: Lysapsus; Cope, 1862

Type species
- Lysapsus limellum Cope, 1862

Diversity
- 4 species (see text)

= Lysapsus =

Genus of amphibians

Lysapsus is a genus of frogs in the family Hylidae found in South America east of the Andes. Their common name is harlequin frogs.

Many frogs in Lysapsus have a paradoxical life cycle. They are most massive when they are older tadpoles and slightly smaller when they are adult frogs.

== Species ==
There are four species:

- Lysapsus bolivianus (Gallardo, 1961)
- Lysapsus caraya (Gallardo, 1964)
- Lysapsus laevis (Parker, 1935)
- Lysapsus limellum (Cope, 1862)

The status of Lysapsus bolivianus is unclear; it might be a subspecies of Lysapsus limellum.
