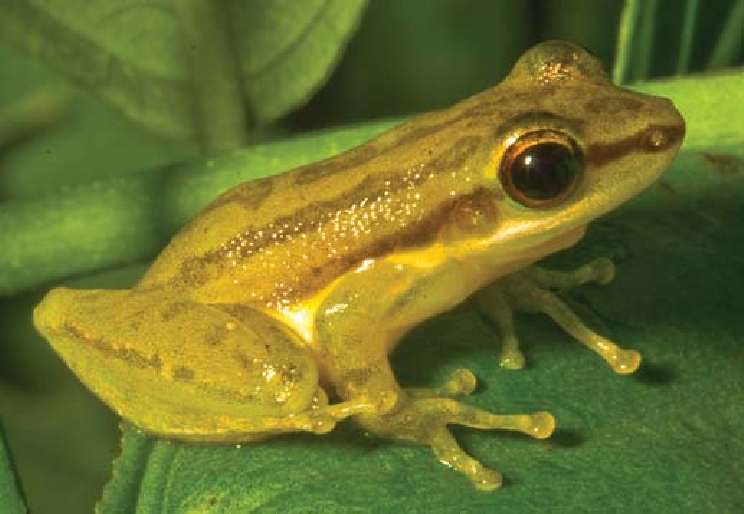
- Scarthyla vigilans

Scientific classification
- Kingdom: Animalia
- Phylum: Chordata
- Class: Amphibia
- Order: Anura
- Family: Hylidae
- Tribe: Dendropsophini
- Genus: Scarthyla; Duellman & de Sá, 1988

Type species
- Scarthyla ostinodactyla Duellman & de Sá, 1988

Species
- Two species, see text

= Scarthyla =

Genus of frogs

Scarthyla is a genus of frogs in the family Hylidae. Species of the genus are found in the upper Amazon Basin of Bolivia, Peru, and Brazil and northward through Colombia and Venezuela to the Caribbean lowlands. They are sometimes known commonly as Madre de Dios treefrogs and South American aquatic treefrogs. They are semiaquatic.

== Species ==
The genus contains two species:

- Scarthyla goinorum (Bokermann, 1962) — Tarauaca snouted treefrog, Madre de Dios treefrog
- Scarthyla vigilans Solano, 1971 — Maracaibo Basin treefrog
