= Women in Kazakhstan =

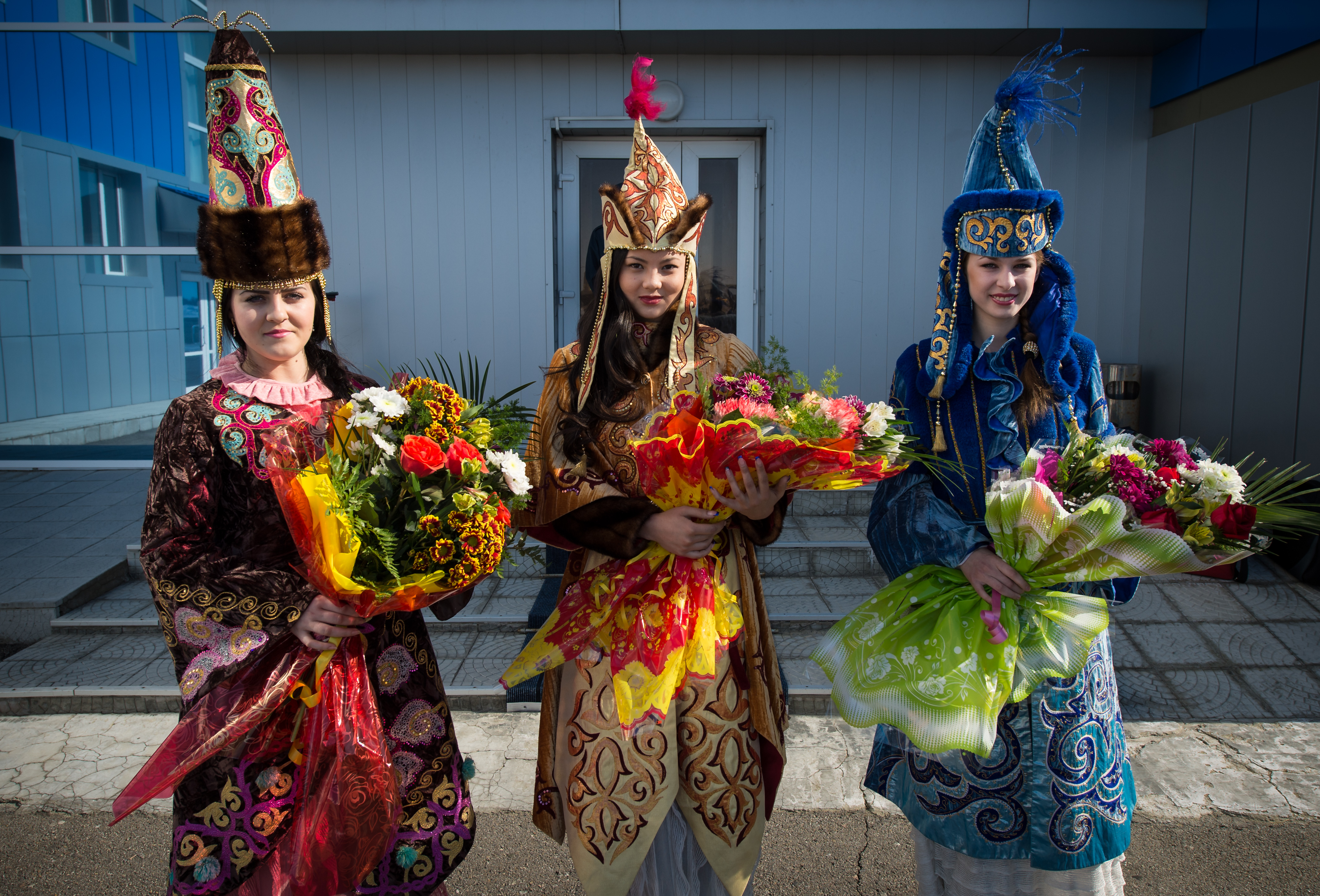
- Kazakh women wearing ceremonial dress

General statistics
- Maternal mortality (per 100,000): 51 (2010)
- Women in parliament: 18.2% (2012)
- Women over 25 with secondary education: 99.3% (2010)
- Women in labour force: 66.6% (2011)

Gender Inequality Index
- Value: 0.161 (2021)
- Rank: 41st out of 191

Global Gender Gap Index
- Value: 0.719 (2022)
- Rank: 65th out of 146

Women in Kazakhstan are women who live in or are from Kazakhstan. Their position in society has been and is influenced by a variety of factors, including local traditions and customs, decades of Soviet regime, rapid social and economic changes and instability after independence, and new emerging Western values.

== Historical context ==
Kazakhstan gained its independence in 1991, after being a part of the Soviet Union for more than 70 years. Following its independence, Kazakhstan's economy, being in a period of transition, experienced, particularly in the 1990s, a strong decline and destabilization: by 1995 real GDP dropped to 61,4% of its 1990 level, resulting also in a brain drain. This situation of economic depression, coupled with emerging traditionalist views on women's roles in society, has had a negative effect on women. Nevertheless, the 1990s also had some positives for women, such as the accession to the Convention on the Elimination of All Forms of Discrimination Against Women in 1998. After its independence, Kazakhstan inherited an education system which was quite developed, but during the period of transition, shortly after the fall of the Soviet Union, the education sector suffered serious losses, was continuously under-funded, and school closures, especially in rural areas, were common. However, today the literacy rate of women in Kazakhstan is among the highest in the world at 99.8%, similar to that of men (as of 2015). Husni-Jamal Nuralyhanova, a native of the Nogai Horde, is notable as the first Kazakh female teacher.

The "Concept of state demographic policy of the Republic of Kazakhstan" was ratified in 2000, which prioritized demographic problems on the same line with national security issues. It allowed addressing the issues of population rise and women's rights in accordance with the long run political model "Kazakhstan 2050 Strategy".

== Reproductive health and fertility ==
The maternal mortality rate in Kazakhstan is 12 deaths/100,000 live births (2015 estimate). The total fertility rate is 2.31 children born/woman (as of 2015), which is slightly above the replacement rate. The contraceptive prevalence rate is 51% (2010/11).

== Forced marriage and bride kidnapping ==
Forced marriage and bride kidnapping are problems with which women and girls are confronted in Kazakhstan, although their exact prevalence is not known. In Kazakhstan, bride kidnapping (alyp qashu) is divided into non-consensual and consensual abductions, kelisimsiz alyp qashu ("to take and run without agreement") and kelissimmen alyp qashu ("to take and run with agreement"), respectively. Some kidnappers are motivated by the wish to avoid paying a bride price.

== Sex trafficking ==
Citizen and foreign women and girls have been victims of sex trafficking in Kazakhstan. They are raped and physically and psychologically harmed in brothels, businesses, hotels, homes, and other locations throughout the country. Dinara Smailova established NeMolchiKz in 2016 to support victims of sexual violence, as well as domestic abuse.

== Women's rights ==
The government reported to the United Nations their plan 2006-2016 Strategy for Gender Equality in Kazakhstan. In 2009 Kazakhstan introduced the law "On Prevention of Domestic Violence." The law provides comprehensive measures to prevent all forms of violence against women.

International Women's Day is an official state holiday in Kazakhstan.

According to the “Youth of Central Asia. Kazakhstan” report prepared by the Friedrich Ebert Foundation and Research Institute Public Opinion, 84.8% of the youth think women in Kazakhstan have enough rights.

The World Bank's Women, Business and the Law report for 2023 shows that women in Kazakhstan enjoy only 75.6% of the rights that men do, placing the country below the world average of 77.1%.

Kazakhstan was ranked 30th out of 144 countries in gender equality in a 2016 report conducted by nonprofit organization Save the Children. The ranking places Kazakhstan ahead of countries such as the U.S. and Japan. Kazakhstan ranked 51st out of 144 countries in the World Economic Forum's 2017 Gender Equality Index.

== Women in government ==
Women are increasingly holding high-ranking political and government positions. In December 2009 Kazakhstan adopted the law "On the state guarantees of equal rights and equal opportunities for men and women", which stipulates equal access of men and women to civil service. There are 28 women in Kazakhstan's 154-seat Parliament, and women represent 25.2 percent of the lower house of parliament. As of March 2017, the share of women in the lower house of parliament was 27%, which is 10% higher than ten years before.

Kazakhstan's first female presidential candidate Dania Espaeva participated in the 2019 presidential elections. As a Mazhilis MP, Espaeva was nominated from the Ak Zhol Democratic Party and was one of seven candidates.

Women represent 22% of the deputies of the mäslihats (local assemblies) and 47% of the officials in the judiciary sector.

Prior to the 2021 Mäjilis elections, women represented 22% of the Kazakh Parliament. At the end of 2020, Kazakhstan introduced a 30 percent quota to increase the representation of women and youth among candidates for Parliament and Maslikhat deputies at all levels. The initiative is expected to increase women's representation in the Government and promote women's rights protection.

== Women in law enforcement and military ==
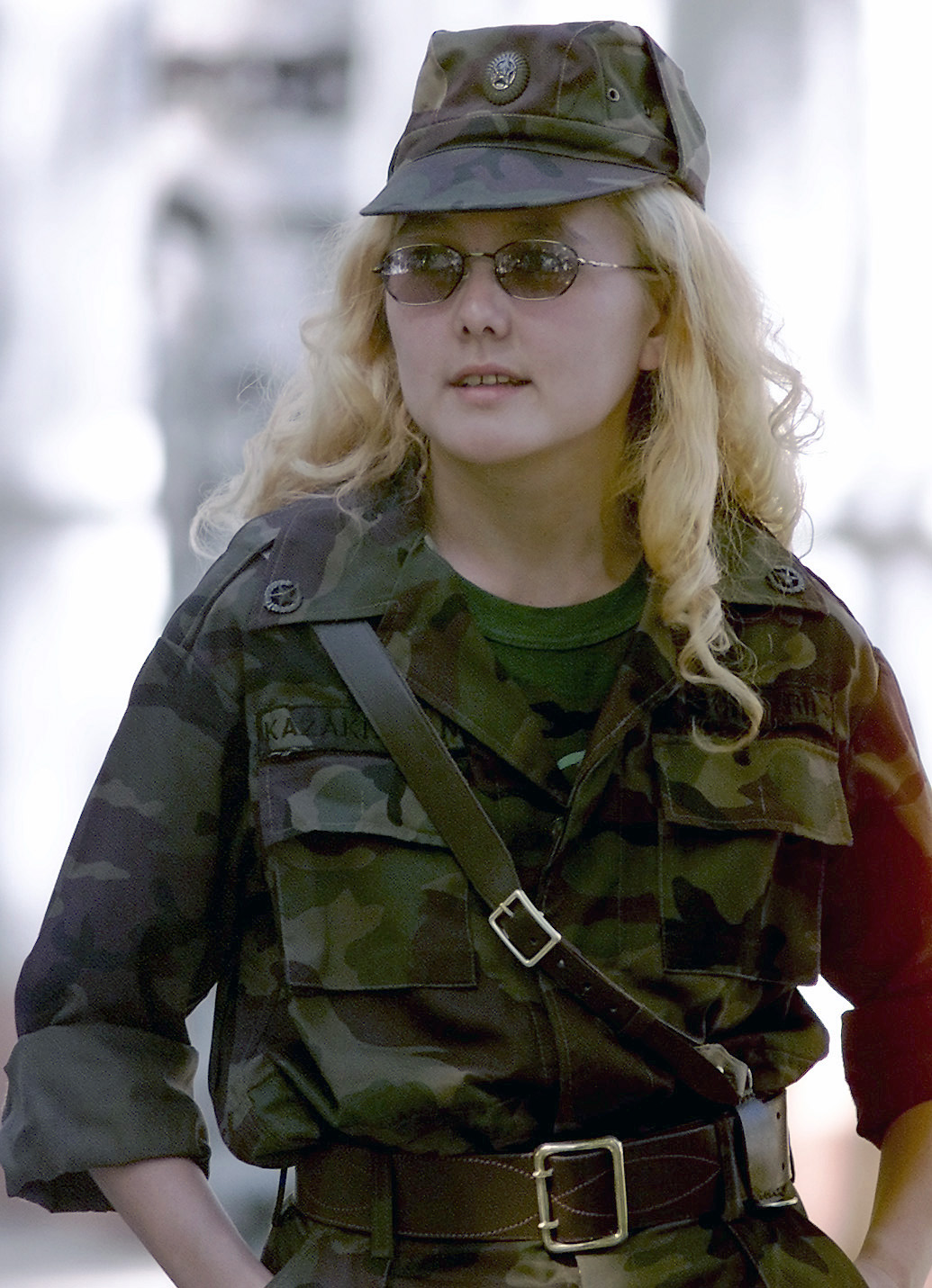
Female soldier of the Army of Kazakhstan

Law enforcement and military careers are considered non-traditional fields for women. It is estimated that somewhere between 6-12% of police officers in Kazakhstan are women. In 1999 a dedicated domestic violence unit was established in Kazakhstan, but due to limited training and resources, this program did not meet expectations and local demand. Recently, Florida State University has been working with the Ministry of Interior of Kazakhstan and the Almaty City Police Department to provide high quality training on domestic violence. This program, funded by the US Department of State, has brought US-based experts on domestic violence response, researchers of gender issues and experts from local NGOs in Kazakhstan together to improve police training on domestic violence.

There are approximately 8,000-8,500 women serving in the Kazakh army. Of those women, 750 are officers. The Ministry of Defence has been working to promote women in the military through educational programs and career advancement opportunities. Only 2.1% of leadership positions within the Ministry of Defence are held by women. The Ministry of Defence also hosts Batyr Arular, which is a nationwide competition for service men and women, showcasing their combat skills, combat readiness and overall physical ability. Batyr Arular gives awards for the best service women.

== Women in business ==
In Kazakhstan 28% of manufacturing firms have female ownership. 1.44 million women are engaged in business in Kazakhstan. 44% of the country's small and medium-sized businesses are now run by women.

Kazakhstan's first women's NGO, the Association of Business Women of Kazakhstan, holds regular summits dedicated to women in business and women's rights. The IV Eurasian Women's Summit was held in Astana in November 2015. During the IV Eurasian Women's Summit, EBRD launched Women in Business programme. Under the programme, EBRD allocates multi-million loans to women-led SME's and assists them with accessing finance and business advice. The EBRD signed the first credit line under the programme in September 2016, providing 3.72 billion tenge (approximately US$20 million) to Bank CenterCredit for on-lending to women-led SMEs.

As of 2019, the EBRD with partner financial institutions provided 21,281 sub-loans worth 28.9 billion tenge (US$76 million) to women-led enterprises in Kazakhstan. The EBRD also implements the Women in Microbusiness programme for 350 women entrepreneurs from 14 Kazakh regions to improve their access to efficient business tools and modernize how they do business.

One of the sessions of Astana Economic Forum in 2015 was dedicated to the International Women's Forum organised by the Kazakh Association of Business Women (ABW). The session was specifically dedicated to the economic benefits of gender equality in Central Asia and Afghanistan.

In 2016 Kazakhstan held its first Women's Entrepreneurship Day (WED) on Nov. 19. WED is a global women's entrepreneurship support initiative launched in 2014 at the United Nations Headquarters in New York City.

Asian Development Bank implements a programme in Kazakhstan that supports small and medium-sized businesses. One-third of lending provided by the Bank was directed to women and 750 projects worth 51.9 billion tenge (US$155 million) were financed.

As of 2020, women account for 5% of the management in Kazakhstan's state-owned companies. On October 22, 2020, Kazakhstan President Kassym-Jomart Tokayev tasked the Government to gradually increase the proportion from 5 to 30%.

== See also ==
- Women in Europe
