= Women in Andorra =

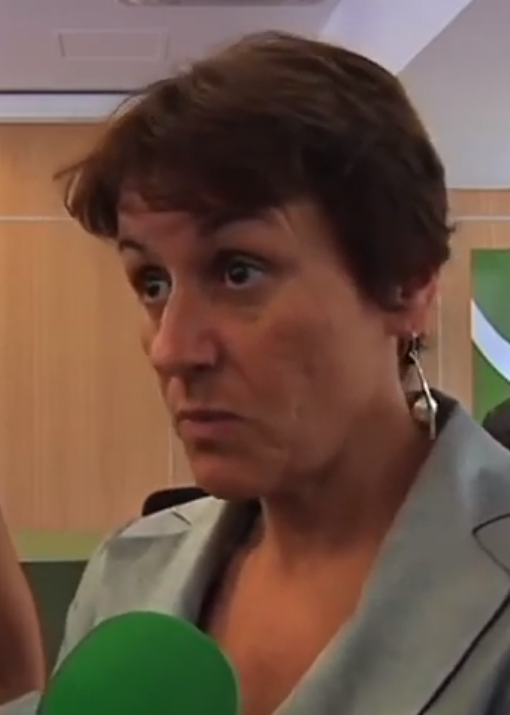
Roser Suñé Pascuet, Andorran politician, former ambassador and first female General Syndic of the General Council

Legally, women in Andorra have equal rights under the laws of the Principality of Andorra. Voting rights were extended to women in 1970, and a majority of the General Council are female. Abortion is illegal and the pay gap is around 40%.

== Women's rights in Andorra ==
Andorra prohibits discrimination based on gender identity.

On 30 April 1967, seven women, representing each municipality in Andorra, submitted a request to exercise political rights and began a campaign to collect signatures. Almost 400 women signed it, and it was presented to the General Council on 15 May 1968. It was approved with 10 votes in favour, 8 against and one abstention, but passive suffrage was not approved. It was finally formally approved by decree on 14 April 1970. Andorran women were not able to be elected until 1973, when lawmakers Jaume Bartumeu Canturri and Òscar Ribas Reig presented a motion to the Consell General to grant them the right, which was approved four months later.

Carme Travesset, who was elected to the city council of Escaldes–Engordany in 1973, was the first woman to hold elected office in the country. Bibiana Rossa and Lydia Magallon became the first female mayors to be elected in 1995. Maria Teresa Armengol became the first female to serve as a member of the Superior Council of Justice of Andorra in 2005.

In 2019, Roser Suñé Pascuet became the first woman to hold the position of General Syndic of the General Council. The percentage of seats held by women in the General Council rose from 36% to 50% after the 2019 election. In 2022, the electoral law was changed and resulted in 40% gender quota for female candidates. Eva Descarrega became Andorra's first female ambassador to Spain in 2024.

In 1994 it was founded the Women's Association of Andorra (Associació de Dones d'Andorra), the country's main women association.

Women were first admitted to the Police Corps of Andorra's tactical team, Grup d'Intervencio Policia d'Andorra, in 2024.

Prostitution is illegal. Abortion, for any reason, is illegal in Andorra. Vanessa Mendoza Cortés, an abortion rights activist, was sued for by the government of Andorra for defamation against the government. The Council of Europe reported in 2020, that Andorra should improve its data collection and support system for sexual violence in order to better implement the Istanbul Convention. The gender pay gap in Andorra is estimated to be between 22-40%.

== See also ==
- Human rights in Andorra
- Women in Europe

== Works cited ==
=== News ===
- "El grup especial d'intervenció de la Policia d'Andorra avança el GEI, el GEO i la UEI amb la primera dona". Altaveu. 30 May 2024. Archived from the original on 27 April 2025.
- "Mor Carme Travesset, la primera dona elegida en uns comicis". Diari d'Andorra. 18 August 2022. Archived from the original on 27 April 2025.
- "Timeline: Andorra". BBC. Archived from the original on 27 April 2025.
- Esteban, Adrian (3 May 2019). "Roser Suñé esdevé la primera dona síndica general d'Andorra". El Periòdic d'Andorra. Archived from the original on 23 April 2025.
- Ribas, Lara (30 August 2018). "El passat legislatiu, a la llum". El Periòdic d'Andorra. Archived from the original on 27 April 2025.
- Solanelles, Toni (31 August 2024). "Eva Descarrega esdevé la primera diplomàtica en assumir l'ambaixada d'Andorra a Espanya". Altaveu. Archived from the original on 27 April 2025.

=== Web ===
- "2019 Report for Andorra". Freedom House. Archived from the original on 27 April 2025.
- "2020 Report for Andorra". Freedom House. Archived from the original on 27 April 2025.
- "2024 Report for Andorra". Freedom House. Archived from the original on 27 April 2025.
