= Women in Montenegro =

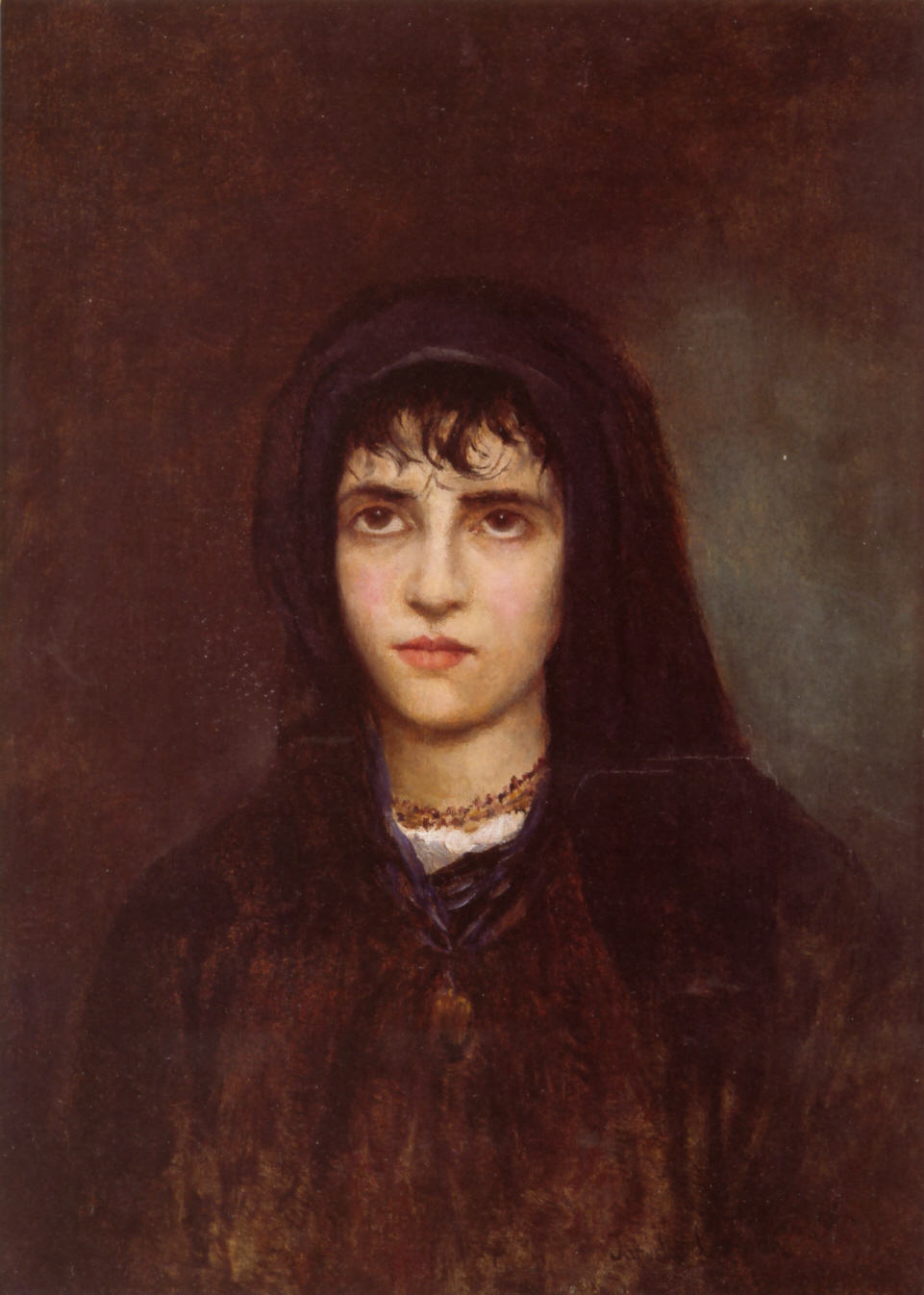
- Portrait of a woman in Montenegro who lived in 1865, painted by Jaroslav Čermák.

Gender Inequality Index
- Value: 0.119 (2021)
- Rank: 32nd out of 191

Global Gender Gap Index
- Value: 0.732 (2022)
- Rank: 54th out of 146

Montenegrin women live in Montenegro, a country in southeastern Europe: a region commonly known as the Balkans. They belong to a group of people known as South Slavs. An early description of women from Montenegro comes from a column of The New York Times on November 5, 1880, wherein the newspaper said that "The Montenegrin woman takes an equal share of labor with the man at field-work, and she does all the carrying" in relation to travel by horse ride and other forms of transport by animals. The newspaper further described them to be engaged in knitting or spinning.

== Physical attributes ==
Among the tallest people in the world, the average height of women in Montenegro is at 171 centimetres (5 ft 7 in).

== Status in society ==
Women in Montenegro may either be living in a conservative and patriarchal Montenegrin society or a matriarchal society depending on the region of their residence. In a family unit that is headed by a male, a woman may act as a guide to the man regarding family matters. In modern times, Montenegrin people have a "caring attitude" to their women.

=== History and the women's movement ===
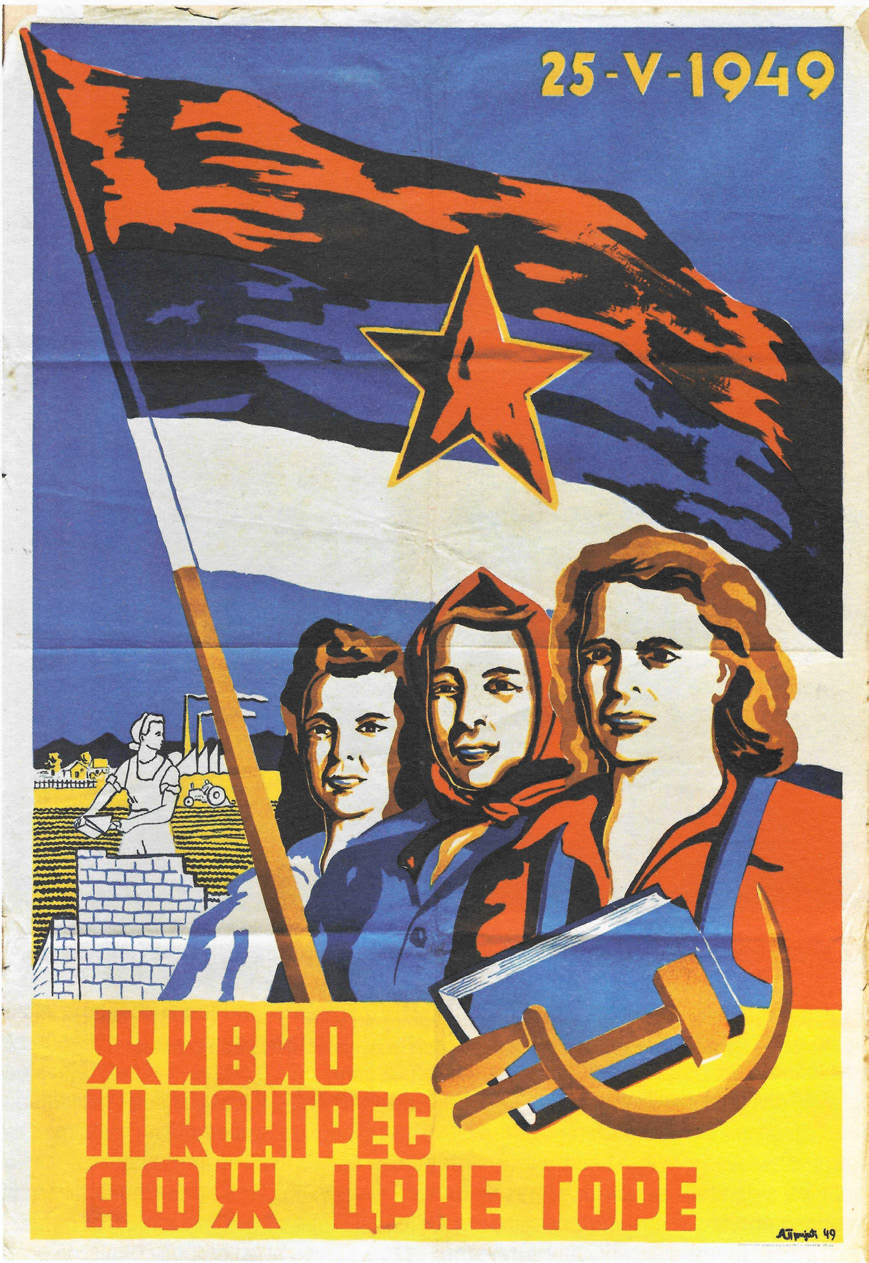
Poster marking the 1949 congress of the Women's Antifascist Front of Montenegro. As well as a woman in the traditional headscarf, it also depicts a woman in worker's overalls and a female bricklayer, indicating how socialism was aiming to broaden women's role in Montenegrin society.

Montenegro was an Orthodox theocracy under Prince Bishops of the Petrović-Njegoš dynasty between 1697 and 1852, and ruled by religious law as well as by patriarchal tribal customary law which heavily promoted the status of men. The status of women first started to change when Montenegro became a monarchy in 1852 and got its first Princess consort, Darinka Petrović, who introduced a gender mixed society life modelled after Western Europe at court and in the upper class.

In 1867 the first school for girls were founded in Cetinje by the first female teacher Jelena Vicković (d. 1908), during a time period when even most Montenegrin males were illiterate: the school was given state support in 1872, and followed by Podgorica (1888) and Bar (1901).

The first secondary school for girls, the Girls Institute of Empress Maria Alexandrovna (1869–1904), was founded by Nicholas I of Montenegro after a trip to Russia by support of the Russian Empress and with Russian teachers; the first female physician Divna Veković was a student of this school. Inspired by the relative progress of Russian women, Nicholas I abolished a number of discriminatory customs in his new law code, such as right of a husband to beat his wife in public, and girls were formally legally included in the public elementary school system in 1914.

Montenegro was late in developing an organized women's movement. However, when Montenegro became a part of Yugoslavia in 1918, the Yugoslav women's movement were expanded to include Montenegro. When Yugoslavia was created, the feminist umbrella organization Yugoslav Women's Alliance inducted the women's movements of each part of the realm, such as Serbia, Croatia or Slovenia, or created new branches, which all promoted the reform of women's rights to the national government; the Feminist Alliance of the Kingdom of Serbs, Croats and Slovenes was further created from it in 1923. During this time period, Montenegro was inducted in to the organized women's movement. However, there was no true change made in the interwar period. It was not until after the Communist take over after the Second world war that the real change came in the situation of women in Montenegro. When the Communists took power, full legal equality between men and women were introduced in the Constitution of 1946 and promoted via the Women's Antifascist Front of Yugoslavia, which created a branch in each part of Yugoslavia, also Montenegro.

== Fertility rate ==
A report from the World Bank shows that the fertility rate (total births per woman) in Montenegro had been declining from 2002 to 2010. The trend was from 1.77 in 2002, then 1.68 in 2008, and 1.66 in 2010.

== Notable Montenegrin women ==
=== Queen of Italy ===
There are notable women in Montenegro in the history of Montenegro. One of them was Elena of Montenegro (1873–1952), the daughter of a former king of Montenegro, who became Queen of Italy. The English historian Denis Mack Smith described Elena of Montenegro, particularly as Italy's queen, as the most influential Montenegrin woman in history; Elena of Montenegro was able to convince her husband Victor Emmanuel III, who was during her time the King of Italy, to impose on Benito Mussolini the creation of an independent Montenegro, against the wishes of the fascist Croats and Albanians (who wanted to enlarge their countries with the Montenegrin territories). Her nephew Prince Michael of Montenegro never accepted the offered crown, pledging loyalty to his nephew King Peter II of Yugoslavia.

=== First female physician ===
Another notable woman from Montenegro was Divna Veković (1886–1944), the first female medical doctor in Montenegro. Apart from being a physician during World War I, Veković was also a humanitarian and a literary translator. As a translator, she was the first to translate The Mountain Wreath (also known as The Mountain of Wreath) from the Montenegrin language into the French language; The Mountain Wreath is a well-known poem and play in Montenegrin literature written by the Prince-Bishop and poet Petar II Petrović-Njegoš. Veković also translated other poems such as that of the Serbian poet Jovan Jovanović Zmaj.

== See also ==
- Gender roles in post-communist Central and Eastern Europe
- Women in Europe
