= Vicković =

Vicković is a surname. Notable people with the surname include:

- Jelena Vicković (1849–1908), Montenegrin educator
- Miroslav Vicković (1951–2004), Montenegrin politician
