= Human trafficking in Kazakhstan =

Kazakhstan ratified the 2000 UN TIP Protocol in July 2008.

In 2008, Kazakhstan was a source, transit, and destination country for men, women, and children trafficked from Uzbekistan, Kyrgyzstan, Tajikistan, and Afghanistan to Kazakhstan and on to Russia and the United Arab Emirates (U.A.E.) for purposes of sex slavery and forced labor in the construction and agricultural industries. Kazakhstani men and women were trafficked internally and to the U.A.E., Azerbaijan, Turkey, Israel, Greece, Russia, and Germany and the United States for purposes of forced labor and sexual exploitation.

In 2008 the Government of Kazakhstan did not fully comply with the minimum standards for the elimination of trafficking; however, it made significant efforts to do so. Kazakhstan demonstrated increasing efforts to combat trafficking over the previous year, specifically by improving efforts to convict and sentence traffickers to time in prison. The number of traffickers convicted in 2007 significantly increased, and the majority of convicted traffickers served adequate sentences in prison. The government also took steps to address government officials’ complicity in trafficking. Kazakhstan allocated nearly $35,000 for victim assistance during 2007.

The U.S. State Department's Office to Monitor and Combat Trafficking in Persons placed the country in "Tier 2" in 2017 and 2023.

In 2023, the Organised Crime Index noted the significance of ‘Bride Kidnapping’ in the country.

== Sex trafficking ==
Citizen and foreign women and girls have been victims of sex trafficking in Kazakhstan. They are raped and physically and psychologically harmed in brothels, businesses, hotels, homes, and other locations throughout the country.

== Prosecution (2008) ==
The Kazakhstan government made significant progress in its anti-trafficking law enforcement efforts over the reporting period. Kazakhstan prohibits trafficking in persons for both labor and sexual exploitation through Articles 128, 133, 125(3)(b), 126(3)(b), and 270 of its penal code, which prescribe penalties of up to 15 years’ imprisonment – penalties sufficiently stringent and commensurate with those prescribed for other grave crimes, such as rape. Police conducted 22 trafficking investigations and initiated 16 prosecution cases in 2007, compared to 13 investigations and seven prosecutions in 2006. Courts convicted 19 trafficking offenders in 2007, a significant improvement from one conviction in 2006. Of the 19 convicted trafficking offenders, one was sentenced to 12 years’ imprisonment, four were sentenced to 10 years’ imprisonment, five were sentenced to seven years’ imprisonment, four were sentenced to six years’ imprisonment, two were sentenced to five years’ imprisonment, and three were sentenced to three years’ imprisonment. During the year there were reports of trafficking complicity of some border guards, migration police, prosecutors, and police. The government prosecuted three corrupt police officials, including the former head of the Anti-Trafficking in Persons Unit in Almaty. One officer was sentenced to six years and six months’ imprisonment and two officers fled authorities and remained in hiding at the time of this report.

== Protection (2008) ==
The government improved efforts to assist and protect victims during the year. The law provides that victims are not penalized for unlawful acts committed as a direct result of being trafficked; however, NGOs continued to report that some victims, as the result of not being identified by authorities, were detained in jail and prevented from leaving the country for periods ranging from a few days to several months. NGOs reported that while law enforcement officials have improved their use of formal procedures to identify victims among vulnerable populations, some labor trafficking victims remain unidentified. In 2007, the police formally identified 87 victims of labor trafficking and 25 victims of commercial sexual exploitation. The government permitted identified victims to remain in Kazakhstan for the duration of the criminal investigation. Many victims refuse to testify for fear of retribution and Kazakhstan has not devoted sufficient resources to address the physical safety of the identified trafficking victim.

== Prevention (2008) ==
The government conducted active public awareness efforts. In 2007, the government funded the production of approximately 3,000 booklets that were distributed by NGOs among groups vulnerable to trafficking, including people in rural areas and school children. The government provided at least $12,500 for anti-trafficking NGOs to conduct awareness campaigns during the reporting period. The government monitors formal migration patterns for evidence of trafficking. The government did not implement measures to reduce the demand for commercial sex acts during the reporting period. Kazakhstan has ratified the 2000 UN TIP Protocol in 2008.

== See also ==
- Human trafficking in Europe
