= Women in Belgium =

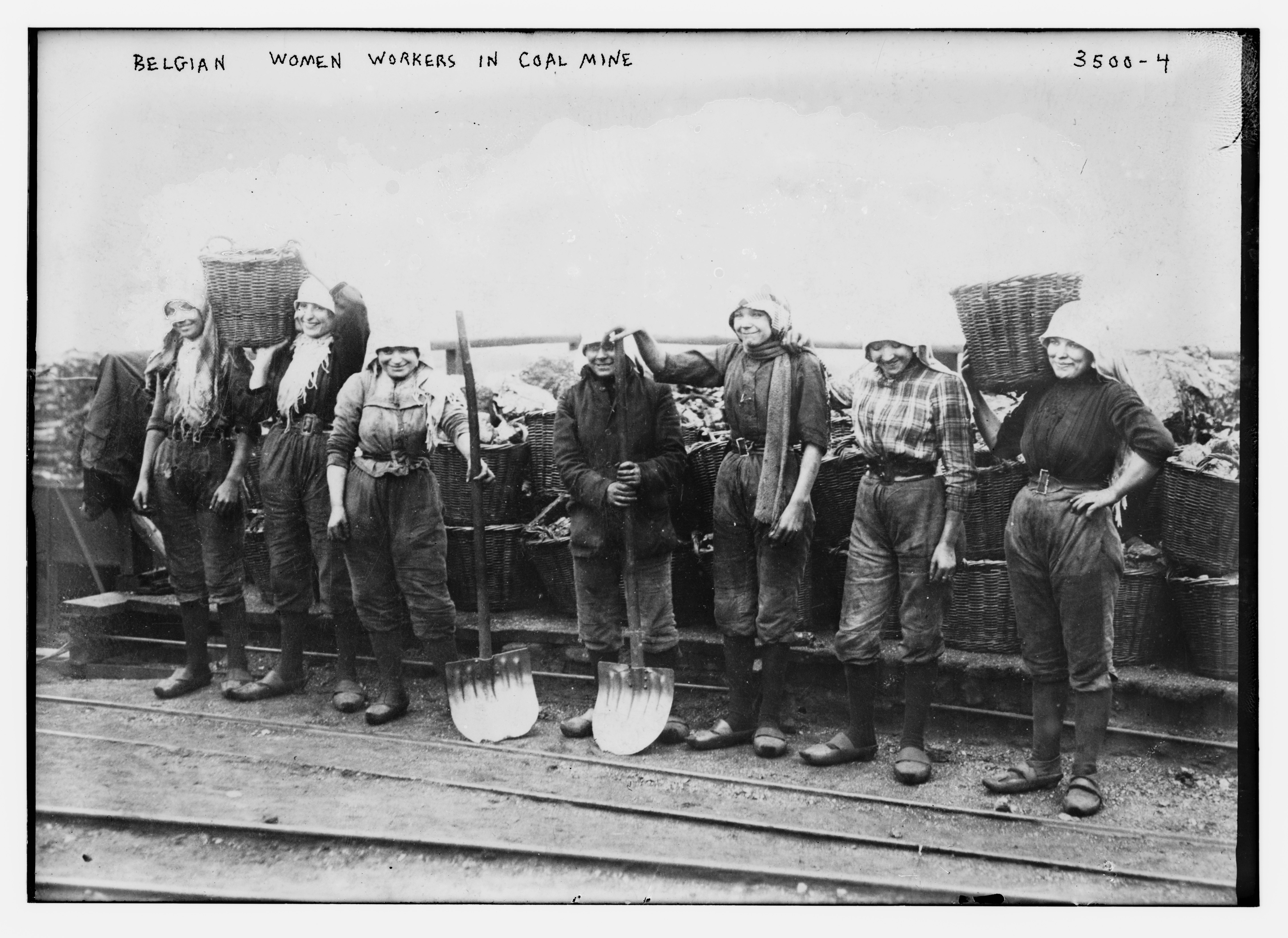
- Female Belgian mineworkers, 1910

General statistics
- Maternal mortality (per 100,000): 8 (2010)
- Women in parliament: 38.9% (2013)
- Women over 25 with secondary education: 77.5% (2012)
- Women in labour force: 61.7% (employment rate OECD definition, 2019)

Gender Inequality Index
- Value: 0.048 (2021)
- Rank: 10th out of 191

Global Gender Gap Index
- Value: 0.773 (2025)
- Rank: 27th out of 148

Women in Belgium have made significant progress to achieve gender equality. In 1999, the average earnings of a Belgian woman was 91 percent of the salary of a Belgian man. In 2024, the gender pay gap had reduced to 4.5%. When not doing part-time jobs, Belgian women still "do more of the domestic work", depending on the agreement between female and male partners.

== Cultural background ==
Belgian culture is complex, because it has both aspects that are shared by most Belgians regardless of the language they speak, as well as differences between the main cultural communities: the Dutch-speaking Flemish and the French-speakers Walloons. The Flemish draw intensively from both the English-speaking culture (which dominates sciences, professional life and most news media) and the Netherlands, while French-speakers focus on cultural life in France and elsewhere in the French-speaking world, and less outside. Today, the Brussels-Capital Region is primarily French speaking, but is quite bilingual, and is also a cosmopolitan place. There is also a small German speaking community in the East of the country. Women's rights in Belgium have been influenced by a variety of factors, including local culture, and national laws and policies. Women obtained the right to vote first with restrictions in 1919, and on equal terms with men in 1948. Women obtained the right to stand for elections in 1921.

== Marriage and family life ==
Like in most other European countries, family law has traditionally given legal authority to the husband; but has been reformed in the second half of the 20th century. The marital power of the husband was abolished in 1958, but property laws were reformed only in the 1970s, when legal gender equality between husband and wife was established. In 1979, the Brussels Court of Appeal recognized marital rape and found that a husband who used serious violence to coerce his wife into having sex against her wishes was guilty of the criminal offense of rape. The logic of the court was that, although the husband did have a 'right' to sex with his wife, he could not use violence to claim it, as Belgian laws did not allow people to obtain their rights by violence. Adultery was decriminalized in 1987. In 1989 marital rape began to be treated the same as other forms of rape under the law. Same-sex marriage in Belgium was legalized in 2003. The divorce law in Belgium was liberalized in September 2007. In the 21st century, the link between marriage and fertility has decreased: in 2012, 52.3% of births were outside of marriage. The centrality of marriage in peoples' life is no longer so strong: in the European Values Study (EVS) of 2008, the percentage of respondents who agreed with the assertion that "Marriage is an outdated institution" was 34.3% in Belgium.

== Reproductive rights and health ==
Abortion laws in Belgium were liberalized in 1990. Abortion is legal until the twelfth week of pregnancy, and it is required for a woman to receive counseling at least six days prior to the abortion and to check in with her doctor to monitor her health in the weeks after the procedure. Abortions at later stages are permitted for medical reasons. The maternal mortality rate in Belgium is 8.00 deaths/100,000 live births (as of 2010). Like most Western countries, Belgium has to deal with low fertility levels and a sub-replacement fertility rate: the total fertility rate (TFR) is 1.7 children born/woman (est. of 2015), which is below the replacement rate of 2.1.

== Women in politics ==
The representation of women in parliament has been increasing steadily since 1995. In lower or single Houses after parliamentary renewals in 2007, women have taken 55 seats to account for 36.7%. In 2014, that number rose slightly to 57 accounting for 38% in the lower or single House. Women in upper houses of parliament in 2007 was 27 out of 71, which was 38%. That number rose to 30 women accounting for 50% total in the upper house in 2014. Belgium has a law requiring political parties to nominate at least 33 percent women. The parties that do not meet the target face sanctions.

== Women in the workforce ==
Belgium, like neighboring Netherlands, has a strong tradition of women fulfilling a predominantly domestic role, rather than a professional one. Roman Catholicism, the traditional religion in Belgium, has supported different gender roles for men and women. However, from the 1990s onward, this has started to change. The occupational gender gap has been decreasing in recent years, especially among younger generations. However, the higher occupational rate of women is primarily due to an increase in part-time jobs. In 2011, 43.3% of employed women worked part-time, compared to only 9.2% of men. There is also a strong segregation by field, and there are less women in Belgium working in STEM and engineering than the EU average.

The gender employment gap for highly educated women decreased to 7% in 2002, below the OECD average. However, the overall employment rate for women aged 20–64 years is 63.0% compared to 72.3% for men (in 2016). The gender employment gap for highly educated women is smallest in Flanders and largest in Wallonia.

== See also ==
- Women in Europe
