= Women in Austria =

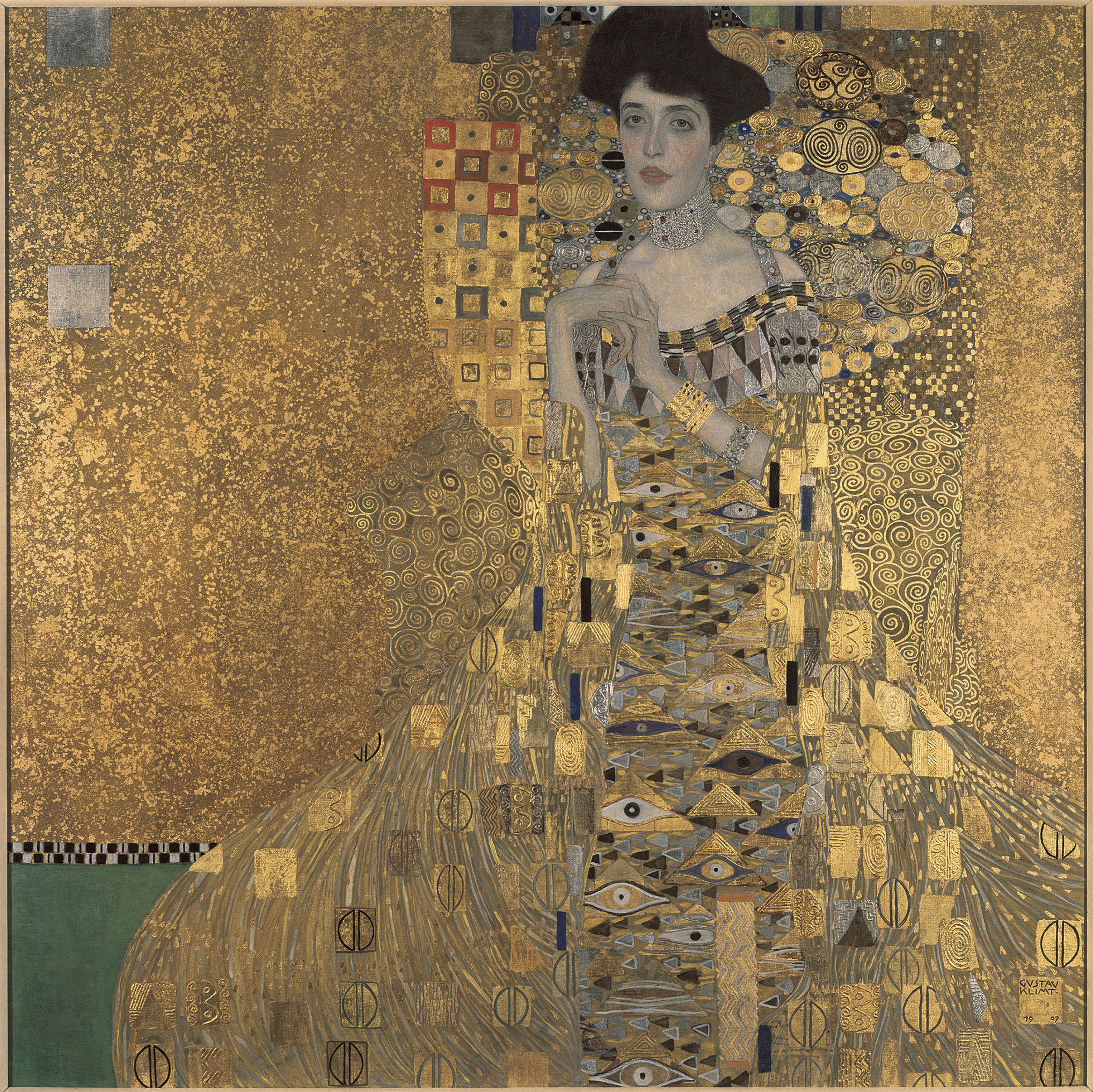
- Adele Bloch-Bauer in Portrait of Adele Bloch-Bauer I by Gustav Klimt, 1907

General statistics
- Maternal mortality (per 100,000): 3
- Women in parliament: 39.3% (2020)
- Women over 25 with secondary education: 98.9%[M: 99.4%]
- Women in labour force: 55.16% [M: 82.7%]

Gender Inequality Index
- Value: 0.053 (2021)
- Rank: 12th out of 191

Global Gender Gap Index
- Value: 0.781 (2022)
- Rank: 21st out of 146

The legal position of women in Austria has improved since the mid-1970s. With regard to women's rights, the priority in Austria is based on the equal treatment of both genders, rather than having equal rights only. Thus, Austrian women benefit from their government's attempt to compensate for gender-specific inequality of burdens. However, the concept of traditional roles, influenced by Roman Catholicism in Austria, is still prevalent within Austrian society.

== Suffrage ==
The first attempts to improve political participation by women were made during the Revolution of 1848 by the Wiener Demokratischer Frauenverein, but the association was short-lived.

The struggle for suffrage began anew with the formation of Allgemeiner Österreichischer Frauenverein in 1893.

Women's suffrage was granted in 1919, after the breakdown of the Habsburg monarchy.

== Marriage and family life ==
As in other European countries, marriage was traditionally based on the husband's legal authority over the wife. Until the late 1970s, married women's freedoms were legally restricted. Austria made marital rape illegal in 1989. Austria was one of the last Western countries to decriminalize adultery, in 1997. In 2004 marital rape became a state offense, meaning it can be prosecuted by the state even in the absence of a complaint from the spouse, with procedures being similar to stranger rape.

In recent years, new ways of living have emerged, with unmarried cohabitation increasing, as more young people are questioning traditional ways. In the European Values Study (EVS) of 2008 the percentage of Austrian respondents who agreed with the assertion that "Marriage is an outdated institution" was 30.5%, and as of 2012, 41.5% of children were born outside of marriage. The total fertility rate is 1.46 children/women (as of 2015), which is below the replacement rate of 2.1.

== Employment ==
Most women are employed, but many work part-time. In the European Union, only the Netherlands has more women working part-time. As in other German-speaking areas of Europe, social norms regarding gender roles are quite conservative. In 2011, Jose Manuel Barroso, then president of the European Commission, stated "Germany, but also Austria and the Netherlands, should look at the example of the northern countries […] that means removing obstacles for women, older workers, foreigners and low-skilled job-seekers to get into the workforce".

== Infrastructure changes ==
In the early 1990s, most of the pedestrian traffic and public transportation in Vienna was accounted for by women. Eva Kail organized "Who Owns Public Space – Women's Everyday Life in the City" in 1991. This exhibit, coupled with a 1999 survey conducted by the City Women's Office, demonstrated that women, in general, had more varied destinations and needed safety measures in travel more than the men in the city. These led to a change in Vienna's urban planning. Some of the changes implemented by the city include widening the sidewalks and adding pedestrian overpasses in certain areas.

Vienna started the Frauen-Werk-Stadt, a project to produce housing complexes designed by female architects specifically to account for the needs of women. These complexes have easy access to public transportation, as well as on-site facilities, such as kindergartens and pharmacies. Similar efforts with a heavy emphasis on aiding women were conducted following Vienna's success.

The changes in infrastructure served to significantly increase pedestrian traffic. As a result, the streets were more densely packed with witnesses of potential crimes. This served to reduce the number of minor crimes committed in public spaces.

Linda McDowell argued that such efforts are counterproductive and act to deepen the existing class struggles in locations such as Vienna. McDowell's main contention is these efforts were not careful enough to account for both women's rights, as well as poverty.

== Islamic veiling ==
Arab visitors to Zell am See in 2014 were issued brochures by local authorities urging them to take off any burqas. In 2017, a legal ban on face-covering clothing was adopted by the Austrian parliament. Headscarves were also banned in 2019 from primary schools, but Kippas worn by Jewish boys and the turban worn by Sikh boys were exempted in the legislature. The Austrian legislators said their motivation was promoting equality between men and women and improving social integration with respect to local customs, and parents who send their child to school with a headscarf would be fined €440 ($427 or £386 as of 2022). In 2020 however, the law was overturned by the constitutional court after it was found to be unconstitutional. The court said the legislature was required to treat various religious convictions equally, because the ban did not apply to the Jewish Kippa or to the turban worn by Sikh males. But in 2025 Austria banned girls under the age of fourteen from wearing headscarves at recess and lessons in school, with the law taking effect in September 2026.

== See also ==
- Anne of Austria
- List of Austrian women artists
- Women in Europe
