= Women in Europe =

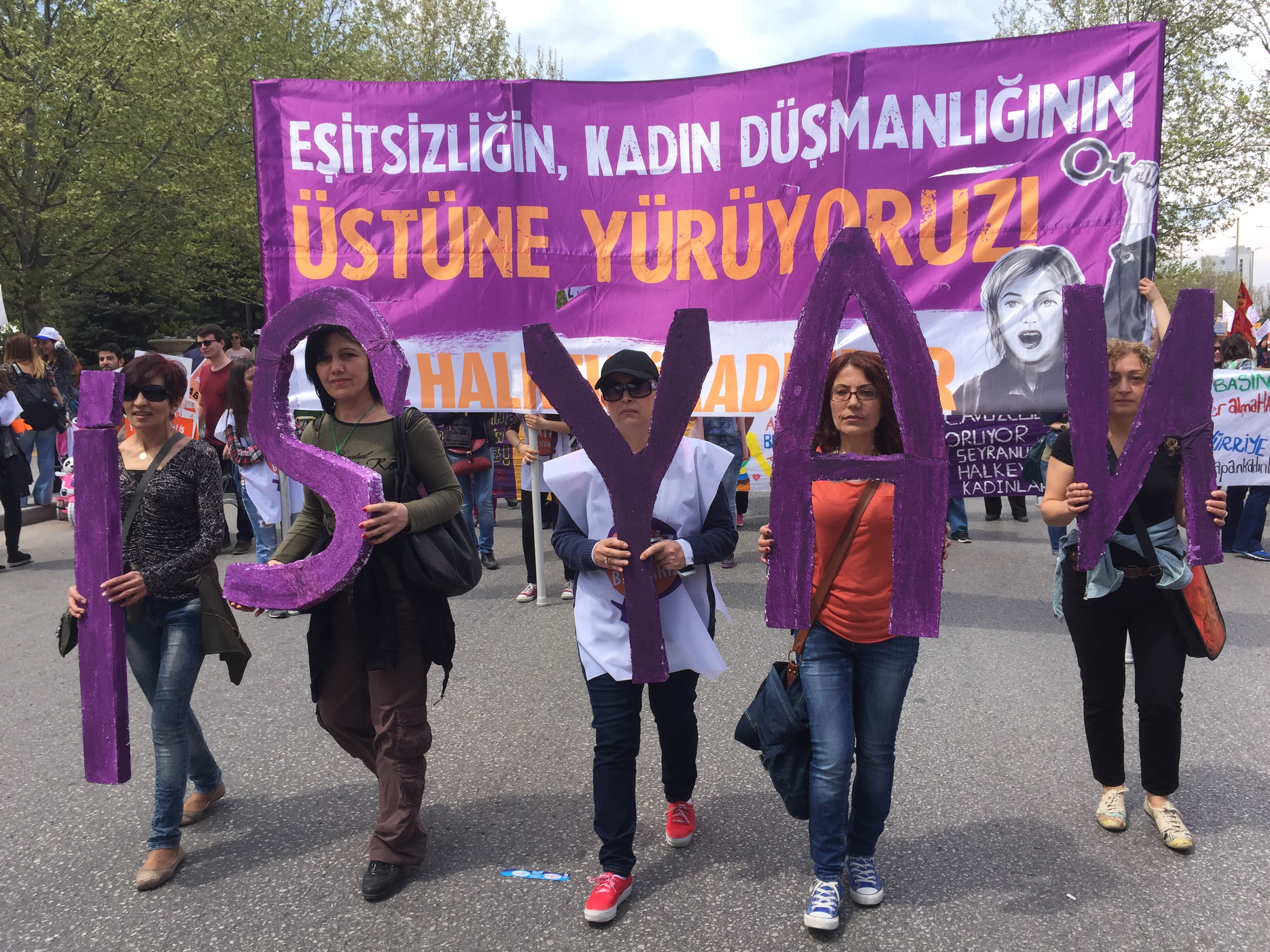
May 1, 2015: Women demonstrate in Turkey.

The evolution and history of European women coincide with the evolution and the history of Europe itself. Women's societal roles and rights vary by country and region and have changed significantly over time.

== History ==
=== Prehistory ===
Research suggests that "in contrast to men, rigorous manual labor was a more important component of prehistoric women's behavior than was terrestrial mobility through thousands of years of European agriculture."

=== Ancient and Modern History ===
According to Michael Scott, in his article "The Rise of Women in Ancient Greece" (History Today), "place of women" and their achievements in Ancient Greece was best described by Thucidydes in this quotation: that The greatest glory [for women] is to be least talked about among men, whether in praise or blame.

The modern-day characteristics of women in Belarus evolved from the events that happened in the history of Belarus, particularly when the "concept of equal rights for women was first developed and substantiated in the late 16th century". The so-called Grand Duchy Charter of 1588 - one of the most important legal documents in Belarusian history - protected the dignity of Belarusian women under the law. Women in Belarus and their contribution to Belarusian society is celebrated annually on 8 March, during International Women's Day.

After attaining the right to vote in German politics in 1919, German women began to take active roles in assuming positions customarily done only by German men. After the end of World War II, they were labeled as the Trümmerfrauen or "women of the rubble" because they took care of the "wounded, buried the dead, salvaged belongings," and they participated in the "hard task of rebuilding war-torn Germany by simply clearing away" the rubble and ruins of war.

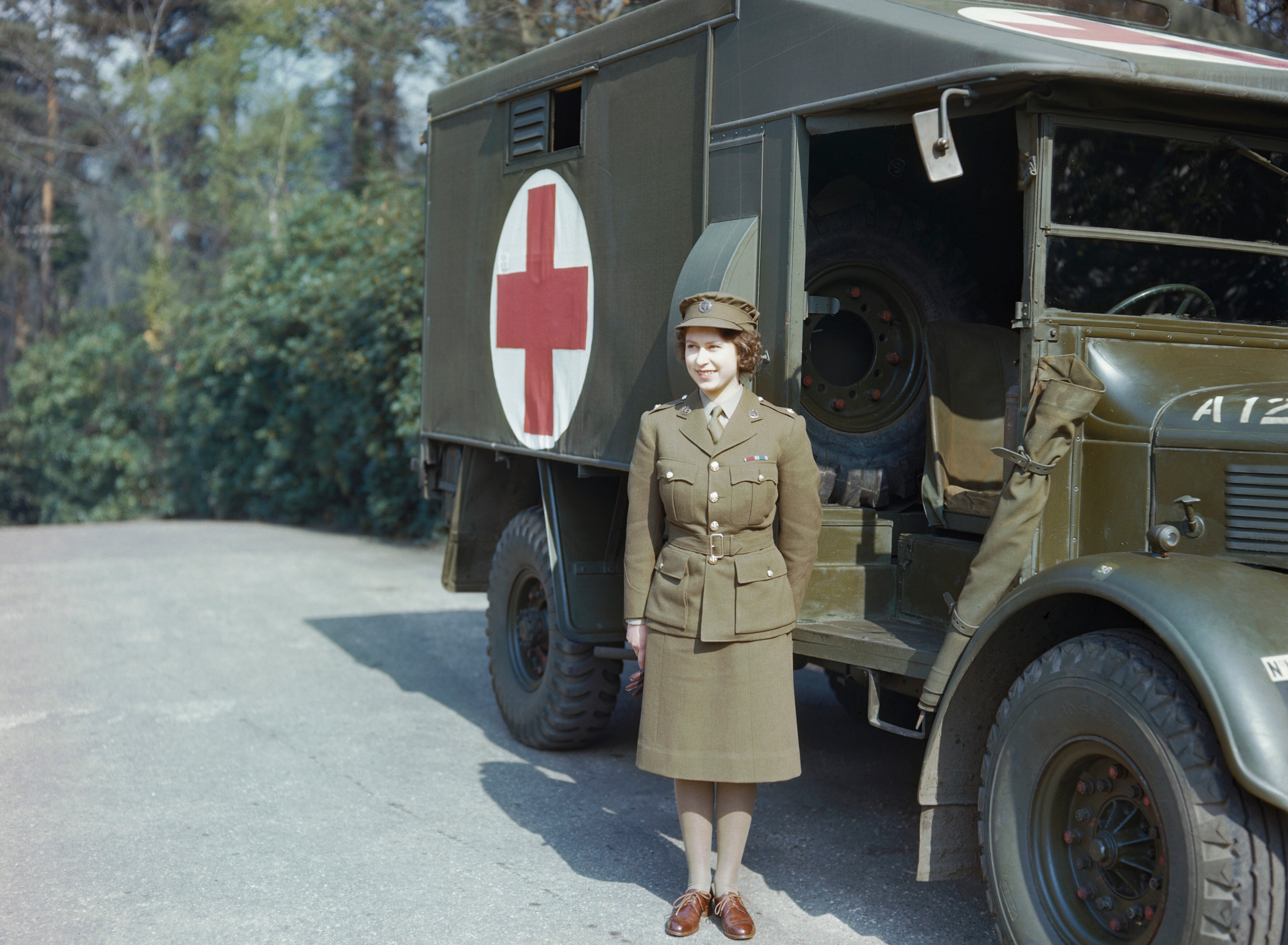
Princess Elizabeth in her ATS uniform in front of a British Army ambulance

== Traditional roles ==
The traditional roles of women in society vary across European states and cultures.

=== Albania ===
Albanian women reside within a conservative and patriarchal society. In such a traditional society, the women of Albania have subordinate roles in communities that believe in "male predominance". This is despite the arrival of democracy and the adoption of a free market economy in Albania, after the period under the communist Party of Labor. Based on the 500-year-old Kanun of Leke Dukagjini, a traditional code of conduct, the main role of Albanian women is to take care of the children and to take care of the home.

=== Armenia ===
Due to the patriarchal nature of traditional Armenian culture and society, women in Armenia are often expected to be virtuous and submissive, to safeguard their virginity until marriage, and assume primarily domestic tasks.

=== Azerbaijan ===
Traditional social norms in Azerbaijan and lagging economic development in the country's rural regions continue to restrict women's roles in the economy, and there are reports that women have difficulty exercising their legal rights due to gender discrimination.

=== Italy ===
In some parts of Italy, women are still stereotyped as being simply housewives and mothers, also reflected in the fact of a higher-than-EU average female unemployment.

=== Montenegro ===
An early description of women from Montenegro comes from a column of The New York Times on November 5, 1880, wherein the newspaper said that "The Montenegrin woman takes an equal share of labor with the man at field-work, and she does all the carrying" in relation to travel by horse ride and other forms of transport by animals. The newspaper further described them to be engaged in knitting or spinning.

=== Switzerland ===
Swiss tradition places women under the authority of their fathers and their husbands.

== Promoting gender equality ==
Legally, women in Andorra have equal rights under the laws of the Principality of Andorra. Andorra was slow to give women legal rights: women's suffrage was achieved only in 1970. In recent years, however, women have progressed significantly. Politically, Andorran women won 15 seats during their country's parliamentary election of 2011; for this reason, Andorra became the first nation in Europe and the second country internationally to have elected a "majority female legislature".

The legal position of women in Austria improved since the middle of the 1970s. Based on a December 1993 study about the status of Women in Austria, the priority of legislation in Austria is based on the equal treatment of both genders rather than having equal rights only. Thus, Austrian women benefit from their government's attempt "to compensate for gender-specific inequality of burdens". However, despite the legislative improvement in relation to the status of women in Austrian society, the concept of traditional roles prevailed. Austrian men regard most household chores and child-rearing responsibilities as being within the realm of Austrian women. Both education and gender are the basis of income levels.

Women in Azerbaijan nominally enjoy the same legal rights as men; however, societal discrimination is a problem. In Croatia, gender equality is part of Article 3 of the Constitution of Croatia. A Gender Equality Ombudsman and the Office for Gender Equality has existed since 2003. Czech Republic After the period in the history of the Czech Republic known as the Velvet Revolution, many women have become individuals with full-time jobs and who, at the same time, are also focusing on their responsibilities as homemakers, giving themselves "a high sense of personal efficacy and independence" within Czech society.

Finnish women enjoy a "high degree of equality" and "traditional courtesy" among men. In 1906, the women of Finland became the first women in Europe to be granted the right to vote. There are many women in Finland who hold prominent positions in Finnish society, in the academics, in the field of business, and in the government of Finland. An example of powerful women in Finnish politics is Tarja Halonen, who became the first female president of the country (she was Foreign Minister of Finland before becoming president).

The status of Grecian women has undergone change and more advancement upon the onset of the twentieth century. In 1957, they received their right to vote, which led to their earning places and job positions in businesses and in the government of Greece; and they were able to maintain their right to inherit property, even after being married.

Today, the Netherlands has the happiest women in the world, according to one study.

San Marino introduced women's suffrage following the 1957 constitutional crisis known as Fatti di Rovereta. Sammarinese women received the right to vote in 1960. They received the right to hold political office in 1973. However, in a 1982 referendum, the women of San Marino did not win the right to retain their Sammarinese citizenship if they married male foreigners (19,000 Sammarinese voters voted to not abolish the 1928 law that striped Sammarinese women of Sammarinese citizenship if they married foreigners); as a result of losing Sammarinese citizenship, the women also lost the right to vote, to work, to own property, to reside in, and to inherit property in the Republic of San Marino. These citizenship laws were later changed by the parliament in 2000, and 2004, allowing women to keep their citizenship and transmit it to their children and husband.

Apart from attaining prominence as "queens and noble women" in Spain's history, Spanish women now also excelled in establishing their role as women of present-day Spain "without a marked feminist rebellion".

Swiss women obtained the right to vote in national elections in 1971; while women obtained the right to vote at local canton level between 1959 (the cantons of Vaud and Neuchâtel in that year) and 1991 (the canton of Appenzell Innerrhoden). However, despite gaining status of having equal rights with men, some Swiss women still have to be able to attain education beyond the post-secondary level, thus they earn less money than men, and they occupy lower-level job positions.

As citizens of a post-war nation, some Kosovar (or Kosovan) women have become participants in the process of peace-building and establishing pro-gender equality in Kosovo's rehabilitation process. Women in Kosovo have also become active in politics and law enforcement in the Republic of Kosovo. An example of which is the election of Atifete Jahjaga as the fourth President of Kosovo^{[a]}, and as such she became the first female, the first non-partisan candidate, and the youngest to be elected to the office of the presidency in the country. Before becoming president, she served as deputy director of the Kosovo Police, holding the rank of Major general, the highest among women in Southeastern Europe.

South Ossetian women experienced situations of armed conflict in their regions. The main organization that promotes and safeguards the status of South Ossetian women is the Association of South Ossetian Women for Democracy and Human Rights (sometimes referred to as Association of Women of South Ossetia for Democracy and Defence of Human Rights) and is currently headed by Lira Kozaeva-Tskhovrebova.

Ensuring equal chances in the workplace for women might generate $160 trillion in value.

=== Women in the workplace ===
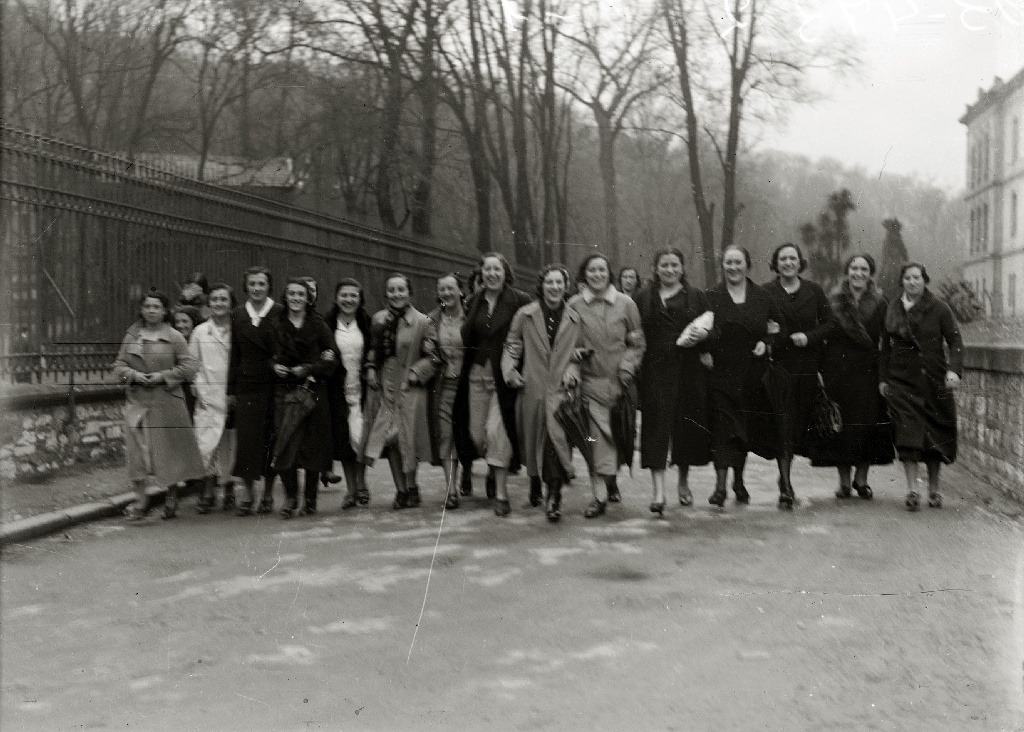
Staff of the Cigar Factory (Tabakalera) in front of the facilities, Donostia-San Sebastián, Basque Country (1936)

Generation after generation, Belgian women are able to close the so-called "occupational gender gap". In younger generations, this is due to the increasing availability of "part-time jobs in services" for women. In 1999, the average earnings of a Belgian woman was 91 percent of the salary of a Belgian man. When not doing part-time jobs, Belgian women still "do more of the domestic work", depending on the agreement between female and male partners.

According to International Fund for Agricultural Development (IFAD), women of Bosnia and Herzegovina have been affected by three types of transition after the Bosnian War (1992-1995), namely: the "transition from war to peace", economic transition and political transition. The resulting effects include: the lowering of their public and social standing because their focus is to "engage in domestic duties" in their homes. Some Bosnian and Herzegovinian women opted to travel outside the country to search for jobs. The more vulnerable women among the social classes are women from the rural area. They are "more marginalized" because of lower level of education and their inclination to tradition, where they rely on men as "primary owners of land and other assets". They also have been described as with "limited access to land, training, modern farming techniques, finances and equipment", thus earn low wages.

On 24 October 1975, 90% of women in the country went on strike, refusing to go to work or take care of the home - instead spending the day on the streets and protesting.

In the field of labor in Italy, female standards at work are generally of a high quality and professional, but is not as excelling as in their education. The probability of a woman getting employed is mainly related to her qualifications, and 80% of women who graduate university go to look for jobs. Women in Italy usually get the same wages as men of their same position. Women holding white collar, high level or office jobs tend to get paid the same as men, but women with blue collar or manual positions are paid 1/3 less than their male counterparts.

Women in the Netherlands still have an open discussion about how to improve remaining imbalances and injustices they face as women; in particular the low participation of women in full-time employment is a political issue. In 2012, 76.9% of employed women worked part-time, well above the European Union average of 32.1%.

By the early part of the 1990s, many women of Portugal became professionals, including being medical doctors and lawyers, a leap from many being merely office employees and factory workers.

At present, many female Spaniards have left their customary status as homemakers to become active in the fields of business, professions, politics, and the military.

According to swissinfo.ch in 2011, Switzerland's State Secretariat for Economic Affairs (Seco) were encouraging business companies to "appoint more women to top-level positions". Those who are already working in business companies, according to same report, mentions that "women earn on average 20% less than men" in Switzerland, and the ratio was 6 out of 10 women were working part-time.

Abkhazian women are more active as participants in the realm of business and in activities related to establishing organizations for women in their country.

Based on a survey of European transport employees, a 2019 Report on Violence Against Women in the Workplace exposes evidence of high levels of violence against women at work across Europe. 25% of the women polled felt that violence against women is a common occurrence in the transportation industry, and 26% say that harassment is considered "part of the work" in the transportation industry.

At the European level, 67% of women are now employed, compared to 79% of males, presenting a 12% gender gap. Only 22% of the transportation workforce is female, with the majority working in administrative jobs and less than 5% working as pilots, sailors, or track or train drivers. For example, in Andalusia, women make about 17% of the land transport workforce.

=== Education ===
In the field of education, women in Italy tend to have highly favorable results and mainly excel in secondary and tertiary education. Ever since the Italian economic miracle, women's literacy rate and university subscription has gone up dramatically in Italy. Women in Italy have a 98% literacy rate, have a basic education and often go to university. 60% of Italian university graduates are female, and women are excellently represented in all academic subjects, including mathematics, information technology and other technological areas which are usually occupied by males.

=== Business ===
Women are overall underrepresented in venture financing. Women have a more difficult time raising funds when starting a business. In 2021, female entrepreneurs received only 1% of venture capital financing. As a comparison, female entrepreneurs in the United States received 2% of total venture capital funds in 2021, the smallest share since 2016.

According to French studies, 10% of female entrepreneurs seek financial assistance from banks, which is around one-third fewer than male entrepreneurs. National efforts such as Enterprise Ireland, the Centre for the Development of Industrial Technology in Spain, and Bpifrance give money for female-owned enterprises in the early stages, but there is no guarantee that those funds will sustain as the firm expands.

Europe continues to trail behind other international regions in terms of the proportion of venture capital and other private investment directed toward women. Female startup entrepreneurs are rare in Europe. The rate of entrepreneurial activity among European women is low, at 5.7%, compared to a global average of 11%. Despite accounting for more than half of the population, women account for fewer than one-third of all entrepreneurs. Female-founded businesses generate double the income per euro invested, even while obtaining less than half the venture capital of their male counterparts.

Diversity at the top of businesses enhances financial performance as well. Businesses with high female participation on their boards outperform their rivals by 28%, while firms with gender-diverse executive teams outperform by 25%.

In 2021, Europe had a record number of successful exits — IPOs, buyouts, or acquisitions – from female-founded firms.

== Sexual harassment and gender based violence ==
Among the problems that confront Andorran women at present are the existence of violence against them, the absence of government departments that deal with issues about women, and the non-existence of shelters for battered women that are managed by the government of Andorra.

Armenia faces the problem of sex-selective abortion.

Around 45 percent of Ukraine's population (45 million) who suffers violence – physical, sexual or mental – are women.

The EU has ratified the Istanbul Convention, a treaty opposing violence against women, as of June 2023. In Europe, only Turkey (which withdrew in 2021), Belarus, Russia, and Georgia, are not signatories.

== See also ==
- Women in the military in Europe
- Demographics of Europe
- Ethnic groups in Europe
- Indigenous peoples of Europe
- European diaspora

=== Sovereign states ===
- Women in Albania
- Women in Andorra
- Women in Armenia
- Women in Austria
- Women in Azerbaijan
- Women in Belarus
- Women in Belgium
- Women in Bosnia and Herzegovina
- Women in Bulgaria
- Women in Croatia
- Women in Cyprus
- Women in the Czech Republic
- Women in Denmark
- Women in Estonia
- Women in Finland
- Women in France
- Women in Georgia
- Women in Germany
- Women in Greece
- Women in Hungary
- Women in Iceland
- Women in the Republic of Ireland
- Women in Italy
- Women in Kazakhstan
- Women in Latvia
- Women in Liechtenstein
- Women in Lithuania
- Women in Luxembourg
- Women in Malta
- Women in Moldova
- Women in Monaco
- Women in Montenegro
- Women in the Netherlands
- Women in North Macedonia
- Women in Norway
- Women in Poland
- Women in Portugal
- Women in Romania
- Women in Russia
- Women in San Marino
- Women in Serbia
- Women in Slovakia
- Women in Slovenia
- Women in Spain
- Women in Sweden
- Women in Switzerland
- Women in Turkey
- Women in Ukraine
- Women in the United Kingdom
  - Women in England
  - Women in Northern Ireland
  - Women in Scotland
  - Women in Wales
- Women in Vatican City

=== European states with limited recognition ===
- Women in Abkhazia
- Women in Kosovo
- Women in Nagorno-Karabakh
- Women in Northern Cyprus
- Women in South Ossetia
- Women in Transnistria

=== Dependencies and other territories ===
- Women in the Åland Islands
- Women in the Faroe Islands
- Women in Gibraltar
- Women in Guernsey
- Women in the Isle of Man
- Women in Jersey
- Women in Svalbard
