= Women in San Marino =

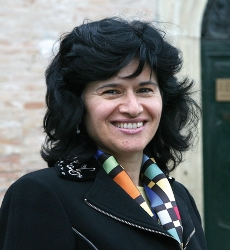
Antonella Mularoni, female Secretary of State of the Republic of San Marino.

Women in San Marino are European women who live in or are from the Republic of San Marino. Sammarinese women currently share almost all social and political rights with men in San Marino.

== Political rights ==
San Marino introduced women's suffrage following the 1957 constitutional crisis known as Fatti di Rovereta. Sammarinese women received the right to vote in 1960. They received the right to hold political office in 1973.

In 1972 it was founded the Union of Sammarinese Women, a union that played a key role in women's reclamations.

== Citizenship rights ==
Before the 21st century, citizenship laws discriminated significantly against women. In a 1982 referendum, the women of San Marino did not win the right to retain their Sammarinese citizenship if they married male foreigners (19,000 Sammarinese voters voted to not abolish the 1928 law that striped Sammarinese women of Sammarinese citizenship if they married foreigners); as a result of losing Sammarinese citizenship, the women also lost the right to vote, to work, to own property, to reside in, and to inherit property in the Republic of San Marino. These laws were later changed; in 2000 the parliament passed a new citizenship law abolishing the previous citizenship law, under which a woman who married a foreigner could not transmit citizenship to her husband or children; and in 2004, new laws stipulated that all women who were San Marino citizens transmitted their own citizenship to their children at birth.

== Violence against women ==
In 2008, San Marino passed Law No.97 of 20 June 2008 on Prevention and Repression of Violence Against Women and Gender Violence.

== See also ==
- List of people on stamps of San Marino
- Women in Europe
