= Women in North Macedonia =

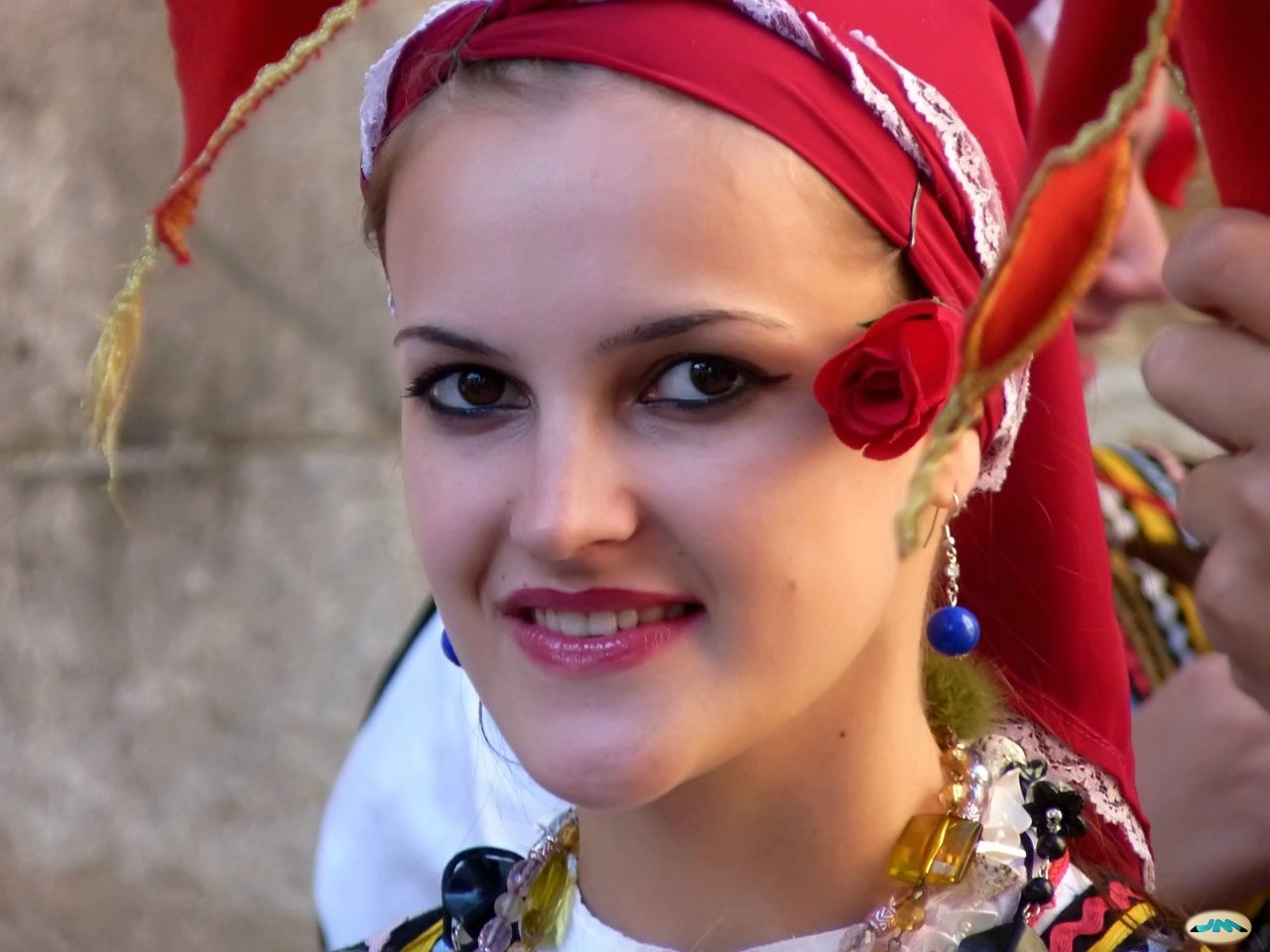
- A woman in North Macedonia wearing traditional garb

General statistics
- Maternal mortality (per 100,000): 7 (2013)
- Women in parliament: 33.3% (2014)
- Women over 25 with secondary education: 40.2% (2012)
- Women in labour force: 44.7% (employment rate OECD definition, 2019)

Gender Inequality Index
- Value: 0.134 (2021)
- Rank: 37th out of 191

Global Gender Gap Index
- Value: 0.716 (2022)
- Rank: 69th out of 146

Women in North Macedonia are women who live in or are from North Macedonia. They live in a society in North Macedonia that is customarily patriarchal. Being in a country that was ravaged by internal conflict known as the 2001 insurgency in North Macedonia, North Macedonia's women played roles in peacebuilding during time periods classified as the pre-conflict period, the conflict period, and the post-conflict period.

Traditionally, the women of North Macedonia perform domestic work. In the field of academics, some women from North Macedonia focus in the study of Humanities. Some women in North Macedonia hold positions of authority. Women receive "inheritance" through the dowry system, because inheritance is traditionally transferred to male heirs. Some modern-day women receive inheritance that is divided among siblings by their parents. The traditional way women greet each other involves exchanging kisses. Traditional medicine is handled by some women of the older generation, who act as faith healers, healing people against illnesses caused by the so-called "evil eye."

North Macedonia made marital rape illegal in 1996.

== See also ==
- Gender roles in post-communist Central and Eastern Europe
- Women in Europe
