= Women in Malta =

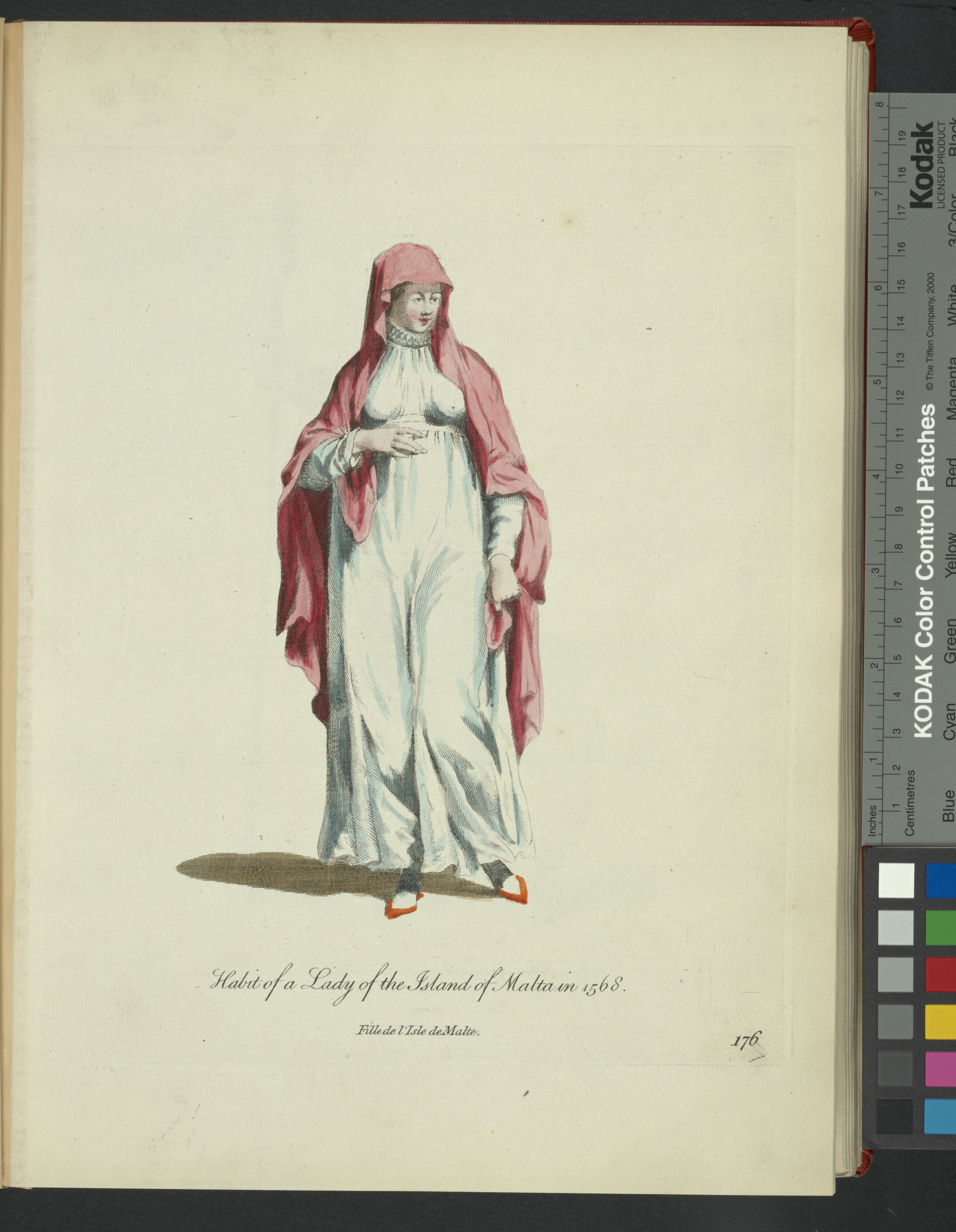
- Maltese woman in traditional attire

General statistics
- Maternal mortality (per 100,000): 8 (2010)
- Women in parliament: 14.3% (2013)
- Women over 25 with secondary education: 68.6% (2012)
- Women in labour force: 63.6% (employment rate OECD definition, 2019)

Gender Inequality Index
- Value: 0.167 (2021)
- Rank: 42nd out of 191

Global Gender Gap Index
- Value: 0.703 (2022)
- Rank: 85th out of 146

Women in Malta refers to, amongst others, the social status of women in Maltese society during Maltese history.

== Education ==
The Roman Catholic Church in Malta, until the late 20th century, held the view that the main roles of women were to marry and become housewives. Becoming a nun was also a role in society which was encouraged.

Higher education of women was first raised in the mid-19th century, when Thaddeus O'Malley of the University of Malta introduced a School of Midwifery at the University in 1841, but the attempt was short-lived. The first women at the University of Malta were Tessie Camilleri and Blanche Huber, who became the first two women to graduate from University: Tessie Camilleri in art 1922 and Blanche Huber in medicine in 1925. Compulsory elementary schooling for all children regardless of gender was not introduced until 1925.

Schooling of girls in Malta in the late 20th and 21st centuries indicates “evidence of remarkable commitment to the full development of girls in a global society.”

== Politics and suffrage ==
Activism in favor of women's suffrage was conducted by Mabel Strickland and later by the Women of Malta Association until voting reform was introduced in 1947.

Fifteen general elections have been contested since the granting of universal suffrage in Malta in 1947. Only 73 women have contested these elections. The number of men, on the other hand, has exceeded 1,000. The number of women contesting general elections has, however, increased over the years. In fact, the 1998 elections saw 24 women candidates participating, the highest number to date, with six of these being elected, registering a 25 percent success rate.

The smallest number of female candidates was in 1947, numbering only two. However, the result showed a 50 percent success rate, since Agatha Barbara was elected. The election of 1955 saw the lowest percentage of women candidates being elected with a 14.3 percent success rate, when only one candidate out of seven was elected. Following this, the success rate rose slowly until, in the 1976 election, there was a 42.3 percent success rate for women candidates. At that time, three out of seven contestants were returned. These were two Labour candidates Agatha Barbara and Evelyn Bonaci, while Anne Agius Ferrante from the PN obtained a seat following a by-election.

However, the success rates of the first and third elections won by female candidates have never been matched up till now (in 1947 it reached 50 percent while in 1951 it was 57.1 percent). The rate slowly rose to 42.9 percent in 1976, but this momentum was lost and success fell to 20 percent in 1981. It rose to just 28.6 percent in 2003. The 2003 election gave the same results as that of 1998, with six women parliamentarians, three each for the two main political parties.

== Women rights and marriage laws ==
Until the late 20th century, the civil rights of married women in Malta were restricted. Malta had a marriage bar until 1980. Until 1993, the family law provided legal authority to the husband over his wife. Women also had reduced protection from violence within marriage, until 1990, section 236 of the Criminal Code of Malta, called "Homicide or bodily harm caused by husband on adulterous wife and adulterer" provided leniency for such homicides committed by the husband; section 236 was repealed by Act No. XXIX of 1990.

In 2015, Malta was criticized by Equality Now for a law which, in certain circumstances, could extinguish the punishment for a man who abducted a woman, if following the abduction, the man and woman got married. (Article 199 and Article 200 of the Criminal Code of Malta) The article was ultimately abolished by Act XIII of 2018, Article 24.

== See also ==
- Malta Girl Guides Association
- Women in Europe
