= Women in Belarus =

- A group of Belarusian women, wearing their national costumes, while getting the bride (seated) ready for her wedding day, dated before 1841.

General statistics
- Maternal mortality (per 100,000): 4 (2015)
- Women in parliament: 33.1% (2017)
- Women over 25 with secondary education: 87.0% (2017)
- Women in labour force: 62% (2014)

Gender Inequality Index
- Value: 0.104 (2021)
- Rank: 29th out of 191

Global Gender Gap Index
- Value: 0.750 (2022)
- Rank: 36th out of 146

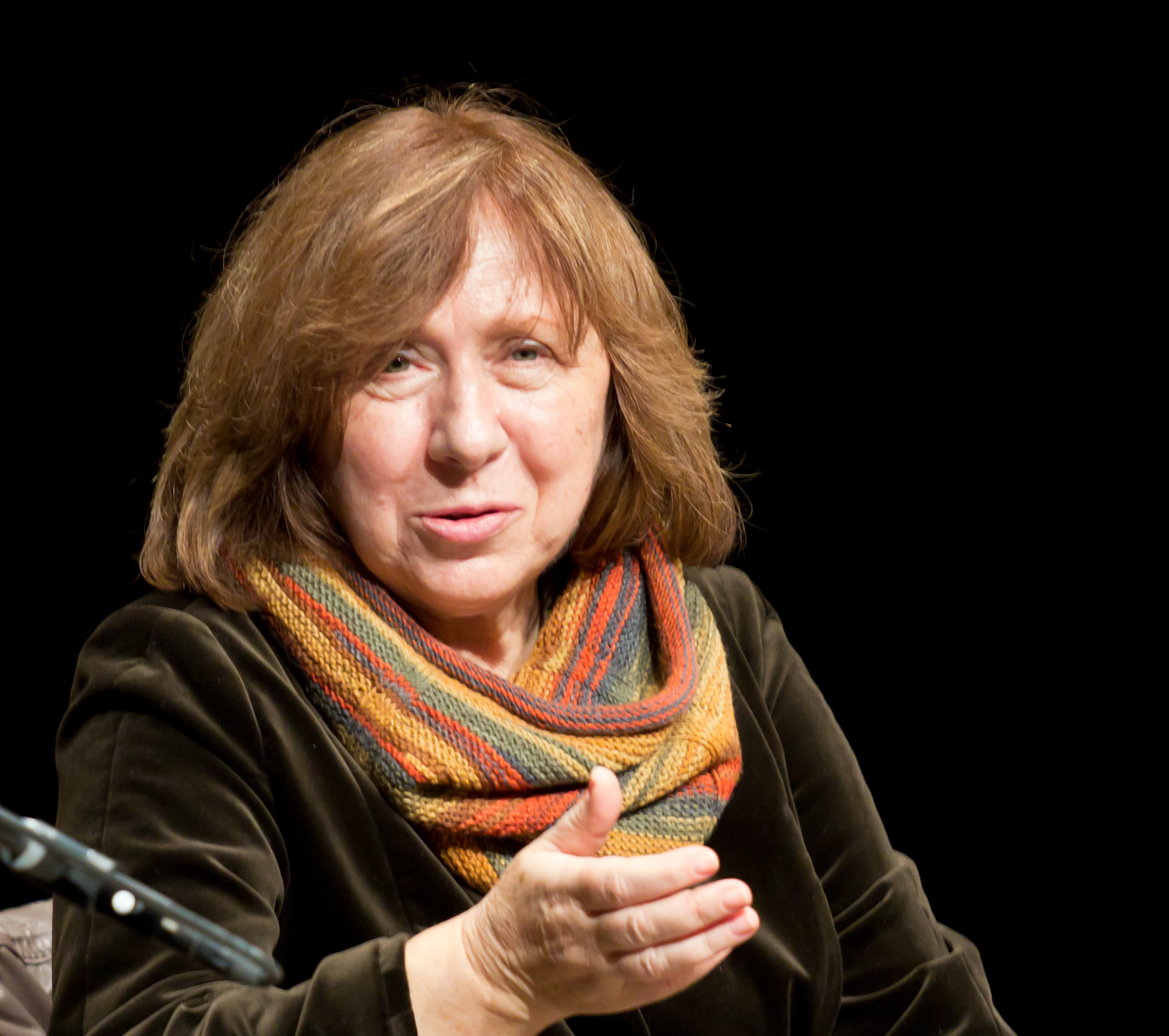
Svetlana Alexievich, born in Ukraine but grew up in Belarus. Won the 2015 Nobel Prize in Literature

The modern-day characteristics of women in Belarus evolved from the events that happened in the history of Belarus, particularly when the "concept of equal rights for women was first developed and substantiated in the late 16th century". The so-called Grand Duchy Charter of 1588 – one of the most important legal documents in Belarusian history – protected the dignity of Belarusian women under the law. Women in Belarus and their contribution to Belarusian society is celebrated annually on 8 March, during International Women's Day.

== Population ==
In 2020, 53.4% of the population of Belarus was female. The 2020 estimated median age for Belarusian women is 43.9. Most Belarusian women fall into the 25-54 age range. The average life expectancy for Belarusian women is at around 79.6 years old.

== Role in society ==
In Belarus, gender roles still remain very traditional. Some of these roles assigned to women are deeply seated in the country's patriarchal culture.

=== Women in the family ===
One obligation for women, usually a mother or wife, is that they must set the dinner table. It would be considered degrading for a man to perform this task. Caring for the household and the rearing of children are also traditionally delegated to them. Traditionally, caring for children under the age of 14 is often left to mothers, and the fathers often do not interfere. Men are often seen as more powerful than women because they are considered to be the breadwinners of the family, while women are tasked with the domestic work and childcare.

=== Women in the workforce ===
Article 14 of the Labor Code of the Republic of Belarus prohibits any discrimination in labor relations, but in spite of this gender inequality is still persistent. A Belarusian woman's average salary is currently 80% of the average salary of Belarusian man, despite having legal provisions established that require equal pay for equal work. The way bonuses are distributed is what causes this discrepancy to result. It is also found to be more likely that a woman will agree to a lower-paying job than a man. For certain jobs in Belarus using women's labor is actually against the law. The country has an official list of jobs that women are not allowed to partake in. Jobs on the list are jobs associated with hazardous industries, increased physical activity or ones that are considered dangerous to health. Women also have a mandatory paid maternity leave for 126 days and a mandatory paid parental leave for 969 days. Despite the gender inequality present in the work force women actually exceed the number of men employed in Belarus, as they constitute 54% of the labour market. In spite of constituting a higher percentage of the labor market, women are still less financially stable than men.

=== Gender rights ===
In Belarus, many people, including women, do not view the unequal status of women as a social injustice. As a result women's rights are widely seen as not important.

Married women in Belarus are entitled to retain personal and private property, income, investments, and other assets earned by them.

== Organizations for women ==
Feminist groups in Belarus first appeared in 1991, and then more were formed onwards. These organizations included the Union of Women in Belarus (formerly known as the Belarusian Committee of Soviet Women), the League of Women in Belarus, the Committee of Soldiers' Mothers, the Women's Christian-Democratic Movement, the Belarusian feminist movement "For the Renaissance of the Fatherland", the League of Women-Electors, and the Women's Liberal Association. The beginning of the 21st century brought a change in the women's movement in Belarus. The movement started to become more structured and as a result the most effective women's organizations emerged with more defined priorities. The “Hope” party which was actually established in 1994 chose to focus on the problem of women’s involvement in politics. Another organization that emerged was the Young Women’s Christian Association of Belarus and their main focus is on the issue of the white slave trade. The Belarusian Organization of Working Women (BOWW, founded in 1996) primarily deals with human rights and social issues in the country. Since 2020, the organization has included and supported female Belarusian artists. This initiative has been even supported by the Swedish Institute. One of the most prominent women's organization to emerge was the Women’s Independent Democratic Movement. The organization promotes political and economic competence among all citizens as well as gender equality.

In 2015, Shmidt V.R. and Solomatina I.V. published a book "Women's activism in Belarus: invisible and untouchable" about women's activism in Belarus. The research included the perspectives of both the activists themselves and those studying their endeavors, integrating them into political agendas and social strategies. Authors actively employ modern methodologies to discern and comprehend the existing limitations and possibilities of women's activism. This entails exploring various approaches to the genealogy of knowledge produced and reproduced by activists, particularly concerning women's issues.

On 28 September 2021, during the government-led attack on NGOs (see Human rights in Belarus#Pressure on NGOs), the Supreme Court of Belarus forcibly liquidated the "Gender perspectives" NGO (Russian: Гендерные перспективы) which promoted the women rights in Belarus by withstanding gender discrimination and domestic violence. GP collaborated with the government on legal issues concerning women and hosted the national hot line for victims of domestic violence which took approximately 15,000 calls in 10 years. After the court liquidated this organization, its team claimed that the government "doesn't care about the needs of a huge number of women experiencing domestic violence or gender discrimination".

== Women in the 2020-2021 Belarusian protests ==
In 2020 and 2021, there were a series of protests in Belarus in the lead up to the presidential elections, and women took important roles in leading and defining the revolutionary momentum.

Prior to the election, Belarusian president Alexander Lukashenko had been repeatedly accused of misogynistic or sexist remarks and behavior which denigrate the dignity of women. Despite the appointed of women such as Natalya Kochanova to high government positions, their roles were often considered tokenistic.

In 2020, Lukashenko was seeking to extend his 26 year reign as president by running for his sixth term. He had jailed or exiled his male opponents in the presidential race. So, Svetlana Tikhanovskaya, Maria Kolesnikova, and Veronika Tsepkalo, formed a political alliance and backed Tikhanovskaya as their mutual candidate to run for president against Lukshenko.

Lukashenko's misogynistic statements became more frequent. 29 May 2020, he claimed that a woman could not become the president, because the "Constitution is not made for a woman". In June, he commented on this issue again: "Our Constitution is such that even for a man this [presidency] is a heavy burden. And if one placed it on a woman, she would collapse, poor thing". Lukashenko's statements were widely broadcast on television. Simultaneously, the authorities started smear campaigns aimed on women active in politics and women partners of male activists. According to Amnesty International report, politically active women were threatened with sexual violence and having their children taken into custody.

== See also ==
- List of Belarus-related topics
- Women in Europe
