= Women in Latvia =

Overview of the topic

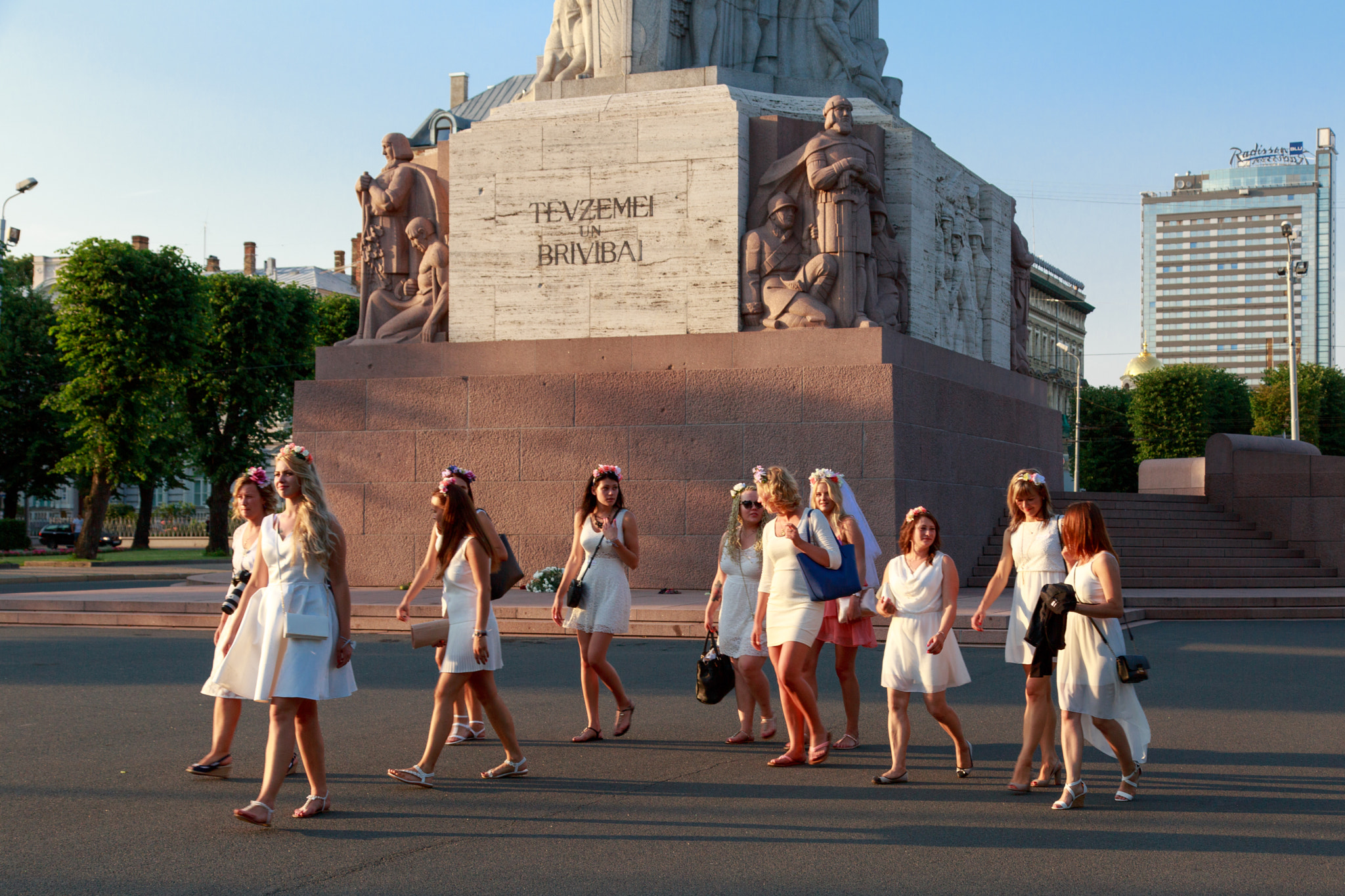

General statistics
- Maternal mortality (per 100,000): 18 (2019)
- Women in parliament: 31% (2019)
- Women over 25 with secondary education: 100.0% (2019)
- Women in labour force: 70.7% (employment rate OECD definition, 2019)

Gender Inequality Index
- Value: 0.151 (2021)
- Rank: 40th out of 191

Global Gender Gap Index
- Value: 0.771 (2022)
- Rank: 26th out of 146

Women in Latvia refers to all the women who reside in, come from and were born in Latvia. The social and legal status of women in the Latvian society has been influenced by its history, geopolitical location and culture. The status of women in Latvia has undergone many changes through history, especially as its territories were a frequent focal point for conflict and conquest between at least four major powers: the State of the Teutonic Order, the Polish–Lithuanian Commonwealth, Sweden and Russian Empire. In the 20th century, Latvia was part of the Soviet Union, it then underwent a period of socioeconomic turmoil in the 1990s, after which it joined the European Union in 2004.

Latvia, although a small country of less than 2 million, is a multi-ethnic country, and therefore the experiences of women of Latvia may differ between various groups.

== Overview ==
Before the 19th century, women were excluded from the political processes, did not have property rights and were expected to run the household. Latvian women were granted the rights to vote after the proclamation of Latvian Independence in 1918. The past decades have seen the gradual transformation of the status and role of women, as Latvia has regained its independence from the Soviet Union and joined intergovernmental organisations, such as the European Union, promoting equality of both genders. Latvia was the first country amongst the former Eastern bloc countries to have a female head of state, former president Vaira Vīķe Freiberga. Latvia has also had two female prime ministers since independence, Laimdota Straujuma and the incumbent Evika Siliņa, who has been serving since September 2023. The European Gender Equality Index indicates that Latvia still ranks below the European Union average on gender equality issues, placing 18th out of the 28 member states. Although women make up more than a half of Latvia's current population, women are still underrepresented in politics, experience lower wages in comparison to their male counterparts and are still expected to take up the traditional gender role. Accordingly, a relatively recent development has been the struggle of women to find a work–life balance. The notion of gender equality is fairly new in Latvia. In the past decade, synchronously with feminism movements around the world, Latvia has seen its own women's movement gradually emerging once again.

== History ==
For further information on Latvia's history see History of Latvia.

=== Pre-Independence ===
Ethnographic research and studies of the common laws of the region, including Latgallian and Curonian, conclude that from the 7th to the 13th century, women in Latvia had no rights to property or rights to vote. Per Inheritance rights, only sons were able to take over the ownership of land. This dictated the social status and role of women in society. Daughters could be bequeathed moveable property only, such as dowry in the form of money, furniture and clothes. The male guardian of the woman, most commonly the father, brother or husband, instead of the woman, took on the public responsibilities and rights connected to these possessions.

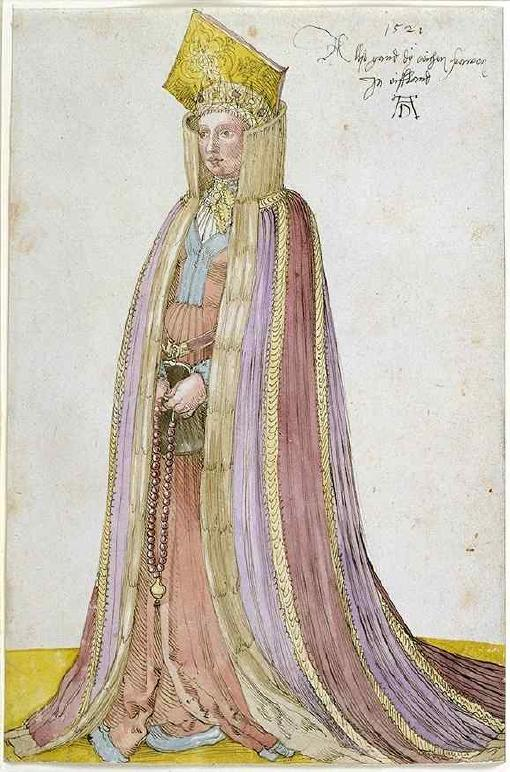
A Livonian woman

In three pre-Christian cemeteries of Lejasbitēni, Salaspils Laukskola and Čunkāni-Dreņģeri, the archaeological material demonstrate the superior social position of males in society. In all three of these cemeteries, more men than women had been cremated. Cremation was tiresome, labour-intensive undertaking. Thus, it has been proposed that women of high social standing only were cremated, whilst the proportionally higher male cremation can also be explained by men partaking in various conflicts and the Livonian Civil War. In addition, women were frequently not buried in cemeteries as they were taken as prisoners during the recurring raids.

The exhumations indicate that women, up until the 19th century in Latvia, had a significantly shorter life span in comparison to men. This can be explained by issues caused by frequent reproduction and inadequate nutrition that their male counterparts didn't experience, as their social position as soldiers earned them the priority of food and medical resources. Childbirth had many risks of complications, as medical aid was limited and older women acted as the midwives. If available, the bathhouse was the most hygienic place for childbirth. For two decades from the age of 20, the Latvian female body went through ongoing distress caused by pregnancy, giving birth and breast-feeding. This caused a reduction in the calcium levels and affected the bone and dental system. Ultimately, all of these factors caused a lower immune system and inability to fight infections. From the 19th century, however, improvements in living standards, education and health care significantly increased the life expectancy of women. Special school for girls that tutored in either Russian or German were established during the 19th century. Achieving education from a peasant background was still difficult.

==== Latvian folk dress and appearance ====
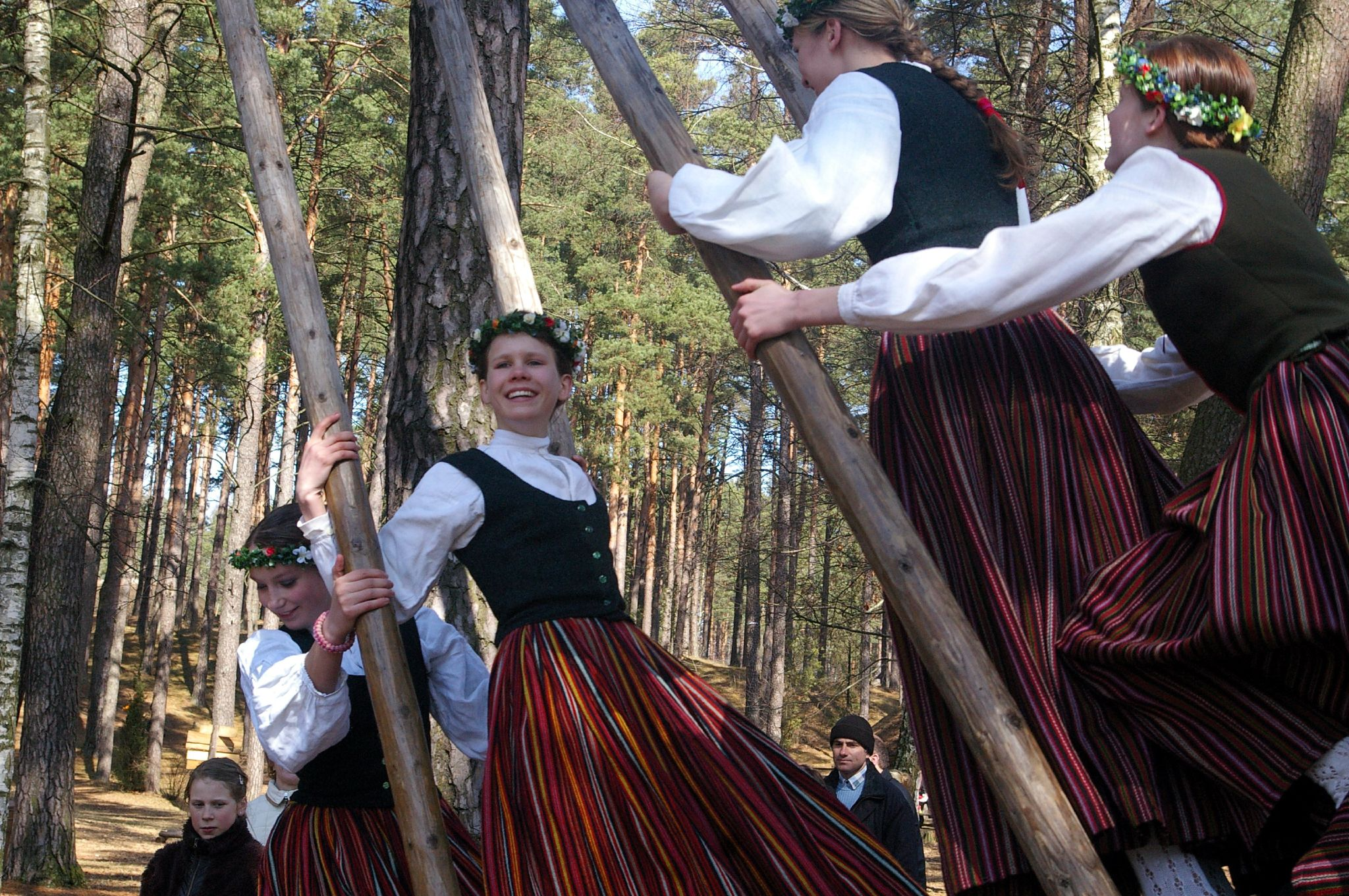
Latvian women swinging in folk costumes during a celebration

The folk dress had and still has a significant symbolic role in the Latvian society, maintaining the national cultural heritage, it has created a united sense of identity amongst Latvians. The variety in folk costumes displayed social status as well as represented the diversity of regions of Latvia and its traditions by the variation in colour and design. Women wore linen shirts and long skirts, as well as woollen villaines (shawls) and coats of various length. During the period of 7th to the 13th of century, known as the "ancient dress" period, bronze jewellery was highly popular amongst women; from rings to saktas (Latvian brooches). These were acquired from the trade routes of northern and eastern Europe, as well as the Middle East. Most of the clothing worn by women was sourced and made locally. Garments were made using linen and wool fabric, whilst leather and fur, obtained from wild or domesticated animals were used to fashion shoes.

An increasingly present German influence from the 12th century onwards left a significant impact on the fashion of women. Bronze decorations were replaced by silver ones. Latvian brooches, worn to fasten shawls, were decorated with colourful pebbles and beads. This is also when the tradition of knitting woollen mittens, socks and gloves appeared, which just as the skirt worn by Latvian women, represented regional varieties through a difference in colour and the use of ornaments. Records from the second period dating 18th-19th century referred to as the "ethnic" period, reveal that most of the Latvian peasants still wore flax and fleece fabric clothing, most commonly in the colours of white and grey. The colours of yellow, green, blue and red were used for decorative purposes.

Towards the end of the 19th century, the first systemised anthropological data was gathered on forty Latvian women from ages 17–60, by Otto Weber (theologian). Conducting his research in the region of Kurzeme (Courland), he remarked that Latvian women have light skin and fair or light brown hair that is straight or slightly wavy, dark brown hair being a rare observation. The eye colour of Latvian women is blue, grey or a mix of both, with brown eyes being infrequent. Waeber noted that the face is of an oval shape with a straight nose and a mouth of average size, with straight teeth. The height of Latvian women is medium to tall, with a well-built, proportional body. Latvian women are typically not overweight according to Waeber's observations. This study has been supported by various accounts of travellers through Latvia, such as in the 1878 work "Picturesque Russia".

=== Independence period ===
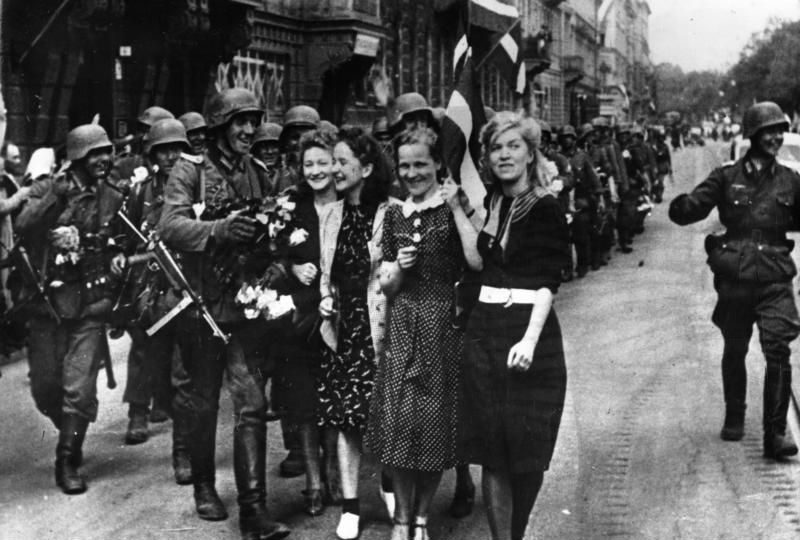
Latvian women welcoming german soldiers entering Riga in 1941

After the Independence of Latvia in 1918, Latvian women became politically equal to men; both genders over the age of 21, could vote in the Constitutional Assembly elections. From 1917 onwards, women could also be admitted as full-time students in universities. The studies most often chosen were in sciences and medicine. This serves as a contrast to the rights of Latvian women under the rule of the Russian empire. The chief motive of the women attempting to get elected into the parliament was the passing of legislation that would grant equal rights under the civil and labour law. In the first Constitutional Assembly, 5 out of the 150 elected members were women. However, this number dropped in the elections of the First Saeima in 1922 and it wasn't until 1931, that the first woman deputy, Berta Pīpiņa, was elected into the Parliament. During her time in the Parliament, Berta Pīpiņa advocated legislative changes which would protect women's rights. Masculine rhetoric dominated the Interwar period. During the Inter-war period, women earned significantly less than their male counterparts. Due to longstanding stereotypes of woman's place at home, as a mother and a wife, women were finding it difficult to achieve senior positions. Women's rights issues were increasingly being debated. Particularly, the civil laws concerning guardianship and hereditary. Between the two world wars, marriage and fertility were on a decline. This can be attributed to the mid-1930s economic depression. From 1940 to 1945 Latvia was occupied both by the Soviets and the Nazis. As per the ideologies of Communism and Nazism, women took on an important civic role during both of these occupations. During the occupation of the Soviets, women were considered a crucial component of the workforce. Under the Nazis, traditional gender roles were re-enforced with women taking on the role of a wife and a mother once again.

=== Soviet-era ===
During the Soviet occupation, in addition to the role of a mother and a wife, women also became workers. In 1989, more than half of the labour force consisted of women. As equal citizens, women received welfare benefits and social security, including health care and child care services. Unemployment was unusual for women in Latvia. However, out of the unemployed population of Latvia, majority were women. Those women with higher education tended to be the first ones to be let go during economic downfall. The choice of jobs was largely limited to the "female-type" jobs, such as secretaries and nurses. Not many women attained managerial positions. Thus, the wages were not equal to the men of Latvia, and women remained dependent on their spouses throughout their lives. Smith suggests that labour equality was not seen as an advantage as it added to the amount of work women had to do. In Soviet Latvia, in most cases, only members of the Latvian Communist Party were able to hold political leadership positions. Only a quarter of Latvian communists by 1945 were women. By 1960s this had increased by nearly 4%. The participation of Latvian women in politics during the Soviet era was very limited, as demonstrated by inactivity in the communist party. Under the Soviet occupation many Latvian women, just as men, were labelled as the "enemies of the people" and prosecuted. During the 1949 Operation Priboi, approximately 19,535 Latvian women were deported to an exile in Siberia on charges. The operation was directed at those opposed to collective farming and supporting the Latvian resistance movements, such as the Forest Brothers.

=== Post-Soviet era ===
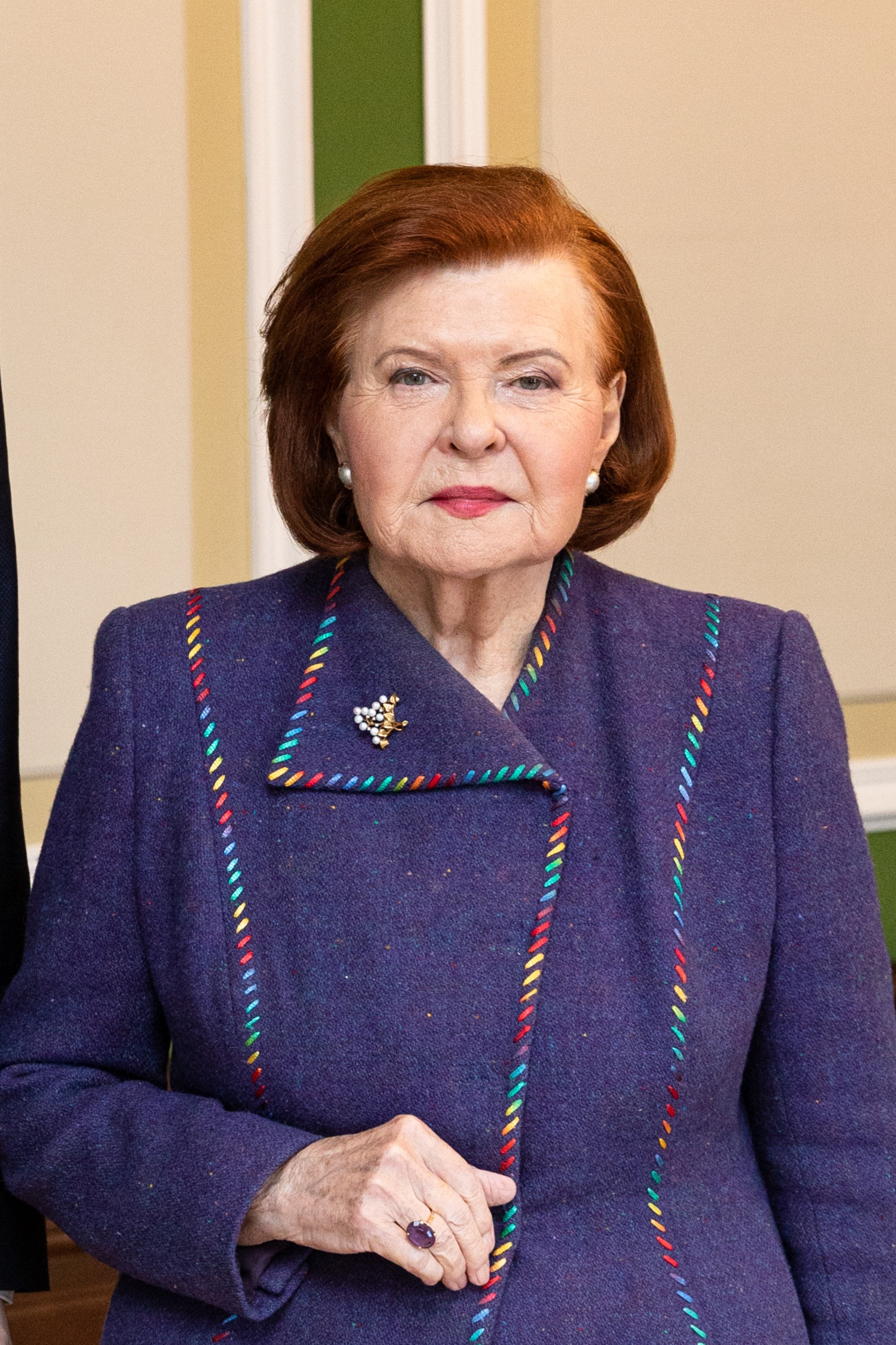
Vaira Vīķe Freiberga served as President of Latvia from 1999 to 2007.

As in other former communist countries, the period of transition was dominated by socioeconomic destabilization and severe hardship.

With the restoration of Latvia's independence, women were again seen in line with typical gender roles. Women had been active in the awakening process but now saw a regression in women's status and rights. During the Independence movement, several prominent women such as Sarmīte Ēlerte, Sandra Kalniete and Ruta Marjaša took up visible roles in the support of Independence. Women against independence from the Soviet Union also rose to prominence, such as Tatjana Ždanoka who became one of the leaders of Interfront. However, during the Independence movement, women's issues were not the primary concerns.

According to Irina Novikova, women were not empowered in the political realm, and thus, experienced more hardship than men, struggled to secure adequate rights, and experienced great hardship in both public and private life. Trafficking of women and prostitution became a major issue as a result of the drop in the living standards. The lack of regulations and laws led to an expansion of the Latvian sex industry. Human trafficking in Latvia also takes the form of women trafficked to Western Europe. Nevertheless, Latvia did have a female head of state, Vaira Vīķe Freiberga, as well as two female prime ministers, Laimdota Straujuma and the currently serving Evika Siliņa.

Despite hardship, women of Latvia have a very strong presence in the workforce, nearly equal to that of men: as of 2019, the employment rate for women and men aged 15–64 were 70.7% and 73.9%.

Violence against women remains a serious problem in Latvia, and the country has the highest rate of murder of women in the EU. In 2020, a study conducted by Eurostat revealed that the three Baltic states had the highest homicide rates in the European Union in that year, with the homicide rate of Latvia being 4.9 per 10,000 people, followed by Lithuania (3.5) and Estonia (2.8). Latvia also had the highest proportion of women as homicide victims among EU countries (60%, compared to an EU average of 37%).

In the 21st century, many Latvian women are part of the Latvian diaspora, and therefore are experiencing directly the culture of other countries. Following Latvia's accession to the European Union and the 2008 financial crisis, as many as 200,000 Latvians left the country.

== See also ==
- Women in Europe
