= Divna Veković =

Montenegrin physician

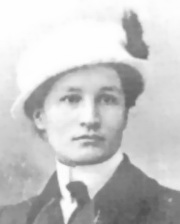

Divna Veković (or Vékovitch) (1886–1944) was the first female medical doctor in Montenegro, the first woman dentist, and the first to gain a doctoral degree. She was a physician at the Salonika front during World War I. Veković was also a humanitarian and a literary translator. She translated a well-known epic poem The Mountain Wreath by Petar II Petrović-Njegoš from the Serbian language into French (Les lauriers de la montagne). She also translated other poems such as that of the Serbian poet Jovan Jovanović Zmaj.

== Biography ==
Veković was born in Lužac, a village in the municipality of Berane in Montenegro in 1886. She was either the sixth or seventh child of her parents, Uros and Tola Vekovic. Veković had her primary school education at the Đurđevi stupovi monastery in her home village of Luzac, and then continued her education in Skopje. She received scholarships to attend the Girls’ Institute in Cetinje, and spent a year at the Midwifery School in Amiens. She completed her medical degree at the Sorbonne, making her the first Montenegrin female medical doctor. She studied dentistry for two years in Paris, graduating in 1917, and was thus also the first woman dentist in Montenegro. When the Balkan Wars broke out in 1912, she became involved in the International Red Cross, and collected supplies for Serbian and Montenegrin prisoners in Hungary and Austria.

Veković worked as a physician at the Salonika front during World War I, and was wounded there.

Veković was also a humanitarian and a literary translator. She was the first to translate The Mountain Wreath (Gorski Viyénatz) from the Serbian language into French (Les lauriers de la montagne). The work is a well-known epic poem in Montenegrin literature written by Petar II Petrović-Njegoš. Veković also translated other poems such as that of the Serbian poet Jovan Jovanović Zmaj. She attained a PhD in literature in 1926 in Belgrade, the first Montenegrin woman to get a doctoral degree, and wrote two dictionaries of French language and grammar.

She lived and worked in France in humanitarian work until the outbreak of the Second World War, at which point she returned to Montenegro. Her death is undocumented, and the date and location are not known, but it is thought to have occurred in 1941 or 1944, possibly in Zidani Most in Slovenia.
