= Dinara Smailova =

Kazakh activist (born 1969)

Dinara Botayevna Smailova (Kazakh: Динара Ботаевна Смаилова; born 12 February 1969), also known as Dina Tangsari (Дина Таңсәрі / Dina Tañsärı), is a Kazakh human rights activist known for her work with survivors of domestic violence and sexual abuse.

== Activism ==
Smailova first began posting online under the pseudonym Dina Tangsari, after the name of the children's theatre she had previously worked at as producer for. In August 2016, Smailova shared a post on social media in which she disclosed that she had been gang raped 20 years earlier, using the hashtag #nemolchi (Russian: немолчи, lit. 'don't be silent'). Later that year, she founded NeMolchiKZ, a non-profit group advocating for the rights of survivors of domestic and sexual violence. Through the organisation, Smailova has provided online consultations to people experiencing domestic abuse. A 2023 report published in Orda stated that through NeMolchiKZ, Smailova's work had led to criminal convictions against 239 rapists, as well as disciplinary procedures against 200 police officers for inaction, in addition to supporting 35, 000 survivors of abuse. In August 2017, Smailova spoke at the United Nations General Assembly about the stigma of rape.

Through her activism, Smailova has been critical of the Government of Kazakhstan, citing its failure to protect women and children from widespread sexual and domestic abuse throughout Kazakhstan. Following controversies, including allegations of fraud and financial mismanagement in 2017 and 2020 which she denied, Smailova left Kazakhstan in 2021, settling in Georgia with her husband and son. While in Georgia, she formally registered NeMolchiKZ under the name Nemolchi.

In 2023, Smailova and her husband, Almat Mukhamedzhanov, were denied re-entry to Georgia following a trip to Turkey. They have since settled in an unspecified country with the European Union, where as of 2024 they are claiming asylum.

== Criminal charges ==
On 16 October 2023, the Oskemen police department began investigating Smailova for fraud, going on to interview at least 800 people who had donated to NeMolchiKZ. Smailova was not made aware of the investigation until a supporter informed her that they had been contacted by the police. On 23 November 2023, prosecutors ordered for Smailova's and NeMolchiKZ's bank accounts to be frozen.

On 27 December 2023, the Ministry of Internal Affairs announced that authorities in Almaty, the Almaty Region and the East Kazakhstan Region were pursuing criminal charges against Smailova. The charges included fraud; violations of privacy; and the knowing dissemination of false information. On 28 December 2023, a court in Oskemen arrested and detained Smailova for two months in absentia, and the police force for the East Kazakhstan Region added Smailova to its wanted list.

Prosecutors claimed that Smailova misappropriated millions of tenge in donations, citing seven donors who had complained of embezzlement, and that she used donations for personal gain and that NeMolchiKZ did not support vulnerable people. They also accused Smailova of sharing personal information about people who used NeMolchiKZ, and of "groundlessly" accusing people of being perpetrators of abuse. Smailova's lawyer, Gulnara Zhuaspaeva, alleged that the police had obtained the information of 7000 individuals who had donated to NeMolchiKZ in order to justify charging her, and further claimed that the seven complaints made against Smailova had only been filed after the police investigation had already started. Zhuaspaeva criticised the prosecutor's claim that Smailova had misappropriated millions of tenge, stating that the total amount donated by the six complainants equated to ₸23, 000. Zhuaspaeva accuse the police of numerous violations during their investigation, including preventing her from accessing case materials.

Smailova appealed her arrest and detainment; in January 2024, the Court of Appeal declined to remove the charges. Smailova subsequently made an appeal to the President of Kazakhstan, Kassym-Jomart Tokayev, to ensure a fair investigation into the charges. Smailova faces a 10 year custodial prison sentence if convicted. Following the charges, Smailova claimed asylum in an unknown European country, with the application pending as of February 2024.

=== Response ===
Human Rights Watch accused the Kazakhstani government of targeting Smailova with "dubious" charges in retaliation for her activism, and called on them to uphold Smailova's right to due process to ensure the criminal justice system was not used to "silence" her.
