= Abortion in Andorra =

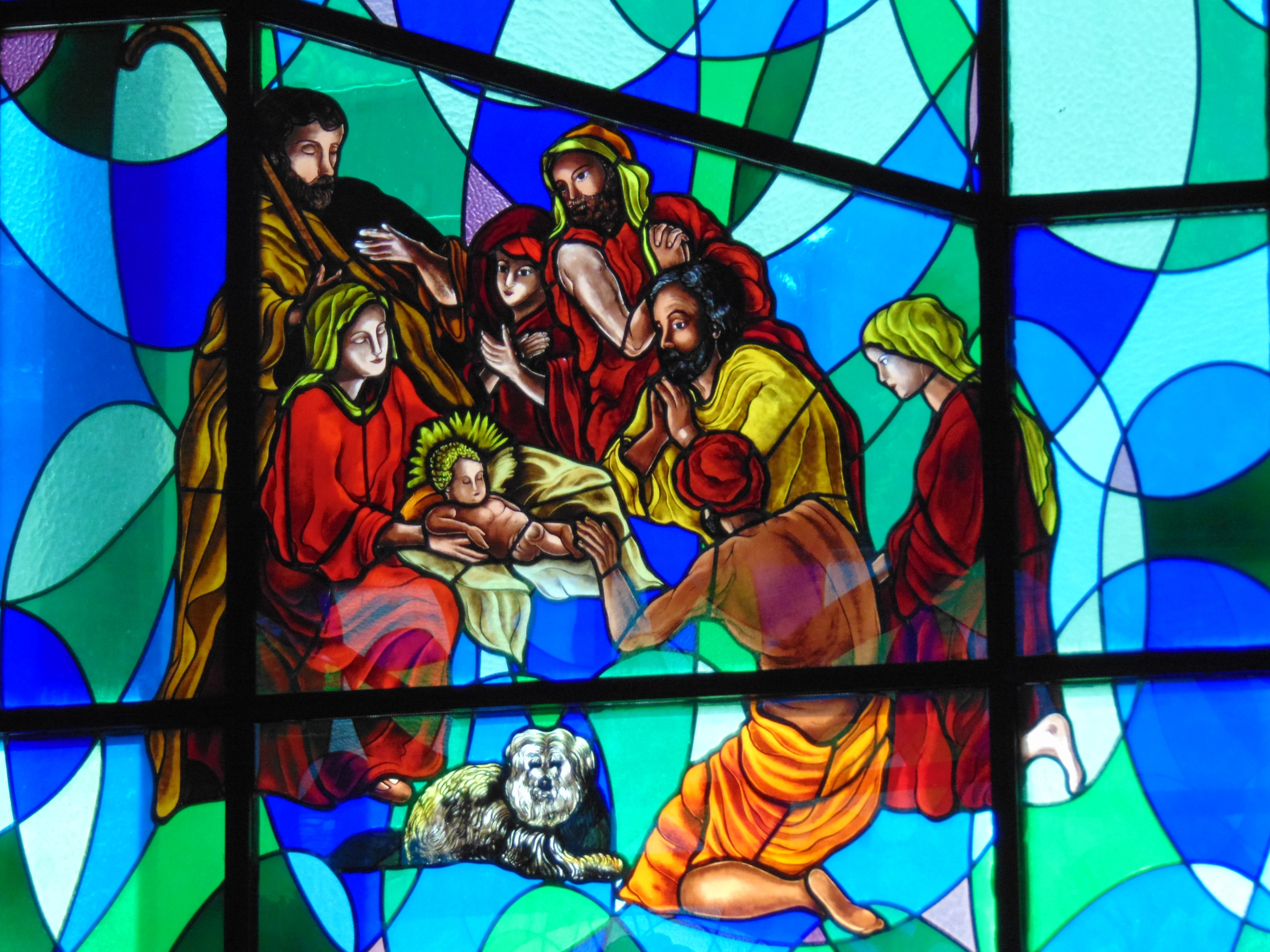
Nativity scene from a church in Encamp.

Abortion in Andorra is illegal in all cases; the Co-Princes of Andorra are the President of France and the Bishop of Urgell, the latter of whom who is required to adhere to Catholic social teaching on pregnancy. The majority of Andorrans identify as members of the Catholic Church.

Andorra, along with Vatican City, are the only two European countries where abortion is completely illegal.

== Law on abortion ==
The Constitution of Andorra states:

Article 8

1. The Constitution recognises the right to life and fully protects it in its different phases.

2. All persons have the right to physical and moral integrity. No one shall be subjected to torture or to cruel, inhuman or degrading treatment or punishment.

3. The death penalty is prohibited.

The Penal Code (Codi Penal) prohibits a number of offences against prenatal human life (Delictes contra la vida humana prenatal) alongside offences against independent human life after birth (Delictes contra la vida humana independent). Article 107 states, in relation to forced abortion:

El qui produeixi l’avortament d’una dona sense el seu consentiment ha de ser castigat amb pena de presó de quatre a deu anys i inhabilitació per exercir qualsevol professió sanitària de fins a deu anys.

Whoever causes the abortion of a woman without her consent must be punished with a prison sentence of four to ten years and disqualification any health profession for up to ten years.

Article 108 outlaws abortion with consent:

El qui produeixi l’avortament d’una dona amb el seu consentiment ha de ser castigat amb pena de presó de tres mesos a tres anys i inhabilitació per exercir qualsevol professió sanitària per un període fins a cinc anys.

Whoever causes the abortion of a woman with her consent must be punished with a prison sentence of three months to three years and disqualification from practising any health profession for a period of up to five years.

Article 109 adds:

El qui per imprudència greu causi un avortament ha de ser castigat amb pena d’arrest o multa fins a 30.000 euros.

Whoever by serious recklessness causes an abortion must be punished with a penalty of arrest or a fine of up to €30,000.

Article 120 protects the unborn child from other forms of assault:

El qui causi en un embrió implantat o en un fetus una lesió o malaltia que perjudiqui greument el seu desenvolupament o li provoqui una tara física o psíquica persistent més enllà del naixement, ha de ser castigat amb pena de presó de tres mesos a tres anys i inhabilitació per exercir qualsevol professió sanitària fins a sis anys.

Any person who causes in an implanted embryo or in a foetus a lesion or disease seriously impairing his development or causing him physical or psychological defect persisting beyond birth must be punished with a prison sentence of three months to three years and disqualification from practising any health profession for up to six years.

The law has no explicit exceptions to its prohibitions. However, under the double effect principle in Catholic medical ethics, an intervention which would unintentionally cause the death of an unborn child is permitted where this would save the life of a pregnant woman (for example, in the ending of an ectopic pregnancy).

== Proposals ==
The Stop Violències movement led by the psychologist Vanessa Mendoza Cortés campaigns against gender-based violence and for the legislation of abortion in Andorra.

In 2018, Pope Francis intervened in the debate by stating that the approval of any legalisation would result in the abdication of Bishop Joan Enric Vives Sicília as Co-Prince.

== Abortion abroad ==
Women in Andorra who choose to terminate a pregnancy usually travel to either neighboring Spain or France where abortion is widely available.
