= Husni-Jamal Nuralyhanova =

Kazakh teacher (1872–1945)

- Хұсни-Жамал Нұралыханова
- Born: 1872; Nogai Horde
- Died: c. 1945 (aged 72–73); Kazakh SSR, Soviet Union
- Occupations: Teacher; author
- Spouse: Aron Qarataev
- Children: 2

Hūsni-Jamal Zūlqarnaiqyzy Nūralyhanova (Note: Often transliterated as Khusni-Zhamal Nuralykhanova through a Russified Romanization of Хусни-Жамал Нуралыханова.) (Kazakh: Хұсни-Жамал Зұлқарнайқызы Нұралыханова; 1872 – 1945) was the first Kazakh female teacher, who once opened an all-female school in the Nogai Horde.

== Biography ==
Nuralyhanova was born in 1872 in the Nogai Horde to a sultan's family. She is a descendant of Abul Khair Khan, a great-granddaughter of Nuraly Khan, and a granddaughter of Jäñgir Khan.

At first, Nuralyhanova got her education from her siblings. Later, she received teacher education from the local Horde school staff. A great influence to her curiosity in science was her father, Zūlqarnai Şökiūly Nuralyhanov, as she spent much time researching and memorising foreign legends. Her grandfather, Jäñgir Khan, in an attempt to open a local library, collected literature, including magazines, newspapers, and books, from places like Moscow, Petersburg, Kazan, and Ufa.

Having finished the Kazan zemstvo school, she started teaching in a Nogai Horde girls' school. Though it operated since 1883, only foreigner girls were educated there. Only after Nuralyhanova's appointment were Kazakh girls enrolled as well. Following her grandfather's interest in educating Kazakh people, she continued teaching, focusing on education outside the basics, including cultural and spiritual values, opening up a teaching yurt, and refusing a salary. In 1894, she opened her own school in the Nogai Horde, despite the opposition by the Astrakhan Governor.

Despite getting married, Nuralyhanova continued her career, even frequently visiting the intelligentsiya meetings in Uralsk and helping with the publication of the "Qazaqstan" newspaper. As a person sceptical of the Monarchy of Russia, she was warned by her husband Aron Qarataev to temporarily stop the publication to avoid political persecution.

An author of articles and a exceeding woman in a patriarchal society, her works were recognized by the thinkers of the time. Her students included the activist Alma Orazbaeva; wife of Seitkali Mendeshev, Räzia Meñdeşeva; mother of Manshuk Mametova, Ämina Mämetova; Nuralyhanova's daughter, Şahzada Şonanova; and others.

Near her later years, Nuralyhanova lived at her daughter Şonanova's house in Alma-Ata. After the arrest of Teljan and Şahzada Şonanova by the Bolsheviks, their apartment was taken away, and Nuralyhanova had nowhere to live. Alienated by her other relatives, her last place of residence is unknown, though a popular theory states that she died from the Kazakh famine in Alma-Ata in 1945.

== Personal life ==
Nuralyhanova was notable in her time as a proficient Russian speaker. She was also familiar with the ideas of Abai Qunanbaiuly and Ybyrai Altynsarin. She was married to Aron Qarataev. They had a daughter, Şahzada Şonanova (1903–1938), who was executed during the Great Purge at only 34 years old, and a son.

In March 2022, pictures of Nuralyhanova, alongside her husband and two children, have resurfaced from the Great Purge archives, as reported by Egemen Qazaqstan.
