= Vanessa Mendoza Cortés =

Andorran activist

Vanessa Mendoza Cortés (born 1980) is a human rights activist and psychologist from Andorra. She is the president of Stop Violències, an organisation that campaigns against gender-based violence and campaigns for the decriminalisation of abortion in Andorra.

== Career ==
Mendoza's career began as a psychologist in Barcelona, however in 2012 she returned to Andorra. In 2014 she founded and became president of Stop Violències, an organisation that campaigns against gender based violence and campaigns for the decriminalisation of abortion in Andorra. In 2018 Mendoza organised the first Andorran street protest, calling for the decriminalisation of abortion. She has been threatened with physical and sexual violence in response to her activism.

Vanessa Mendoza Cortés was charged with criminal defamation after voicing concerns about Andorra’s total abortion ban at a meeting of the United Nations Committee on the Elimination of Discrimination against Women (CEDAW) to examine the country’s record on women’s rights in 2019.

In 2020, after the Government filed a complaint, the public prosecutor brought three criminal defamation charges against her, but following an international outcry, two of the charges involving prison sentences were dropped. In December 2023 Vanessa Mendoza Cortés faced trial accused of a ‘crime against the prestige of the institutions’.

On January 17th, 2024, she was acquitted by the Court. Amnesty International and other organizations commented on this occasion that "Vanessa Mendoza Cortes has paid a high price for defending human rights. She has endured an unjust protracted judicial process of more than three years which has impinged on her crucial work and that of the organization she represents".
