= Lužac =

- Town
- Location within Montenegro
- Coordinates: 42.831672°N 19.847298°E
- Country: Montenegro
- Municipality: Berane

Population (2023)
  - Total: 1,004
- Time zone: UTC+1 (CET)
  - Summer (DST): UTC+2 (CEST)

Lužac (Serbian Cyrillic: Лужац) is a Town in the municipality of Berane, Montenegro. It is located just outside the town of Berane.

== Demographics ==
According to the 2023 census, its population was 1,004.

Ethnicity in 2011
Ethnicity	Number	Percentage
Serbs	555	56.5%
Montenegrins	358	36.4%
other/undeclared	70	7.1%
Total	983	100%
