= Sex trafficking in Kazakhstan =

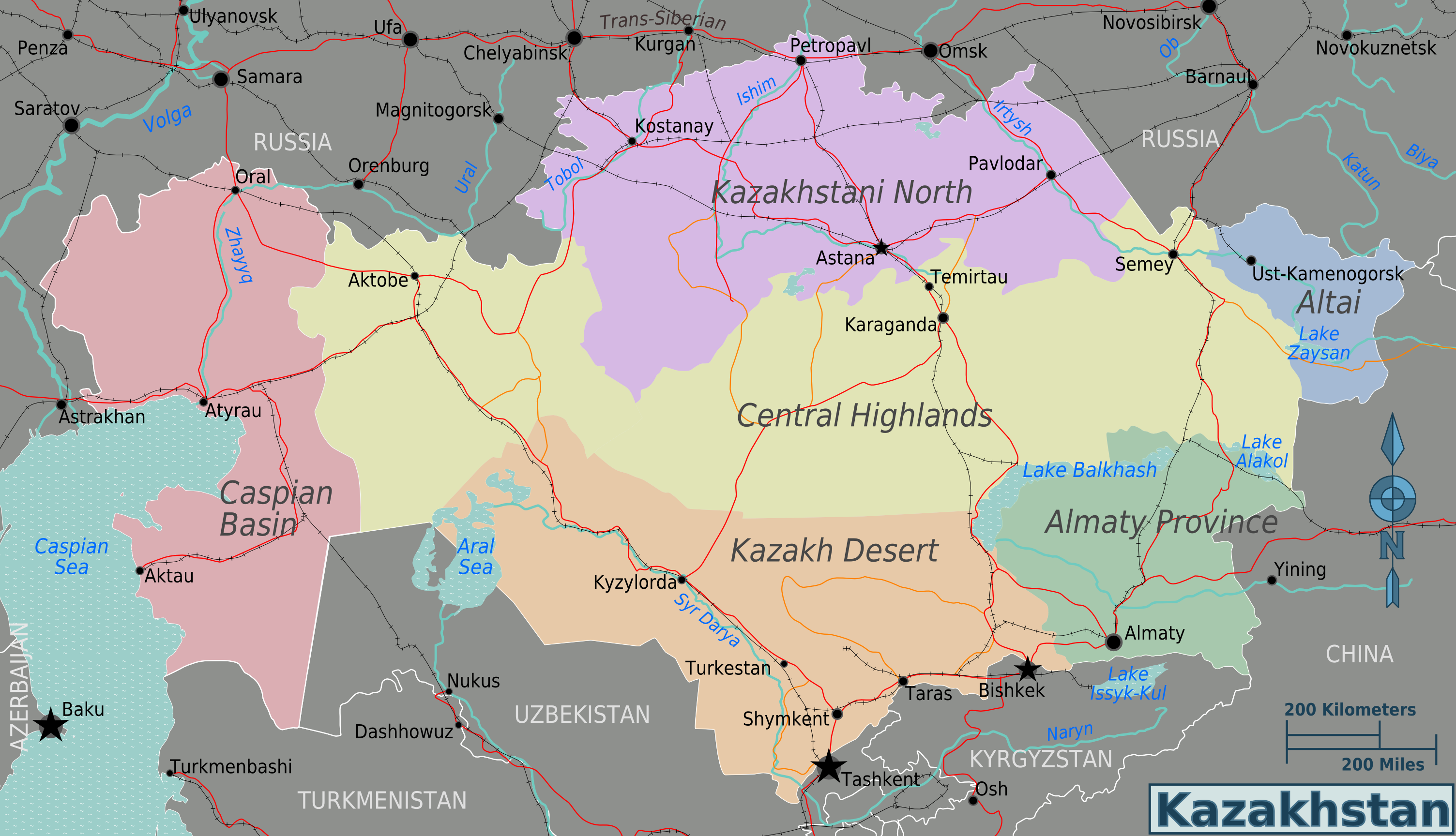
Citizen and foreign victims are sex trafficked into and out of the regions of Kazakhstan. They are raped and physically and psychologically harmed in brothels, businesses, homes, hotel rooms, and other locations within these administrative divisions.

Sex trafficking in Kazakhstan is human trafficking for the purpose of sexual exploitation and slavery that occurs in the Republic of Kazakhstan.

Kazakhstan citizens, primarily women and girls, have been sex trafficked within the country and to other countries in Asia and different continents. Foreign victims are sex trafficked into the country. Children, persons in poverty, and migrants are particularly vulnerable to sex trafficking. Victims are deceived, threatened, or forced into prostitution or forced marriages. Their passports and other documents are often taken. They suffer from physical and psychological abuse and trauma and are typically guarded and or locked up in poor conditions. A number contract sexually transmitted diseases from rapes. Many victims are afraid to report their experiences to the police because of fears of being stigmatized and rejected by their communities.

The government of Kazakhstan has been criticized for its inadequate anti-sex trafficking efforts and corruption. Police and officials have been accused of being complicit in sex trafficking crimes in the country.

== Bride kidnappings ==
Non-consensual bride abductions, in which women and girls are forced into marriages and pregnancies through force, intimidation, or societal pressure, is a form of sex trafficking in Kazakhstan.

At the Fourth World Conference on Women, bride abductions were recognized as a type of "culture-based violence against women" in Kazakhstan. Despite the fact that they have many characteristics with human trafficking as defined by the United Nations, they have not been regarded as a form of it. And despite efforts to stop it, Kazakhstan has made bride abduction more straightforward.

== Non-governmental organizations ==
The International Organization for Migration supports projects against sex trafficking in the country.

The Sana Sezim Legal Centre for Women's Initiatives conducts anti-sex trafficking efforts in Kazakhstan.
