= Jelena Vicković =

Montenegrin pioneer educator and women's rights activist

- Born: Kotor
- Occupations: Educator; Activist

Jelena Vicković (1849–1908), was a Montenegrin pioneer educator, educational reformer and women's rights activist. She was the first professional female school teacher in Montenegro, and founded the first school for girls in Montenegro. She began the movement to educate girls at a time when girls were not included in the school system.

== Life ==
Jelena Vicković was born in Kotor. She moved to Cetinje in 1867, at the end of her education, and founded a girls' school there. This was a time when most women in Montenegro was illiterate; there was no schools for girls in Montenegro, and women had to either be given private tuition in the home or study abroad. Initially her school was a small private school in her home, and girls were education for free, but it was to become a pioneer institution. Vicković's curriculum included reading, writing, arithmetic, performance, and handicrafts. Her school started a debate about women's education in Montenegro, and in 1872, her school was given state support as the first public school for women in the country. Her school became a role model, and new schools for girls were founded in Podgorica (1888) and Bar (1901), and in 1869 the Girls Institute of Empress Maria Alexandrovna was founded as the first institution for higher learning in Montenegro. However, girls were not included in the compulsory education school system until 1914, and the organized women's movement was very slow to develop in Montenegro.

Vicković worked as a teacher all her life, eventually working in a mixed-gender school, until her retirement in 1897. She died in 1908. The Voice of Montenegro credited her with educating all the women in the country: "With her death, the spiritual mother of our literate female world disappeared, because there is no literate woman in our country who was not Jelena’s student or a student of her students.”

Jelena Vicković was included in the project "Remarkable Women of Montenegro", a project about women of the history of Montenegro, created by the Embassy of the Netherlands and Center for Women's Rights.
