= Cross of the Seven Arms =

Andorran award

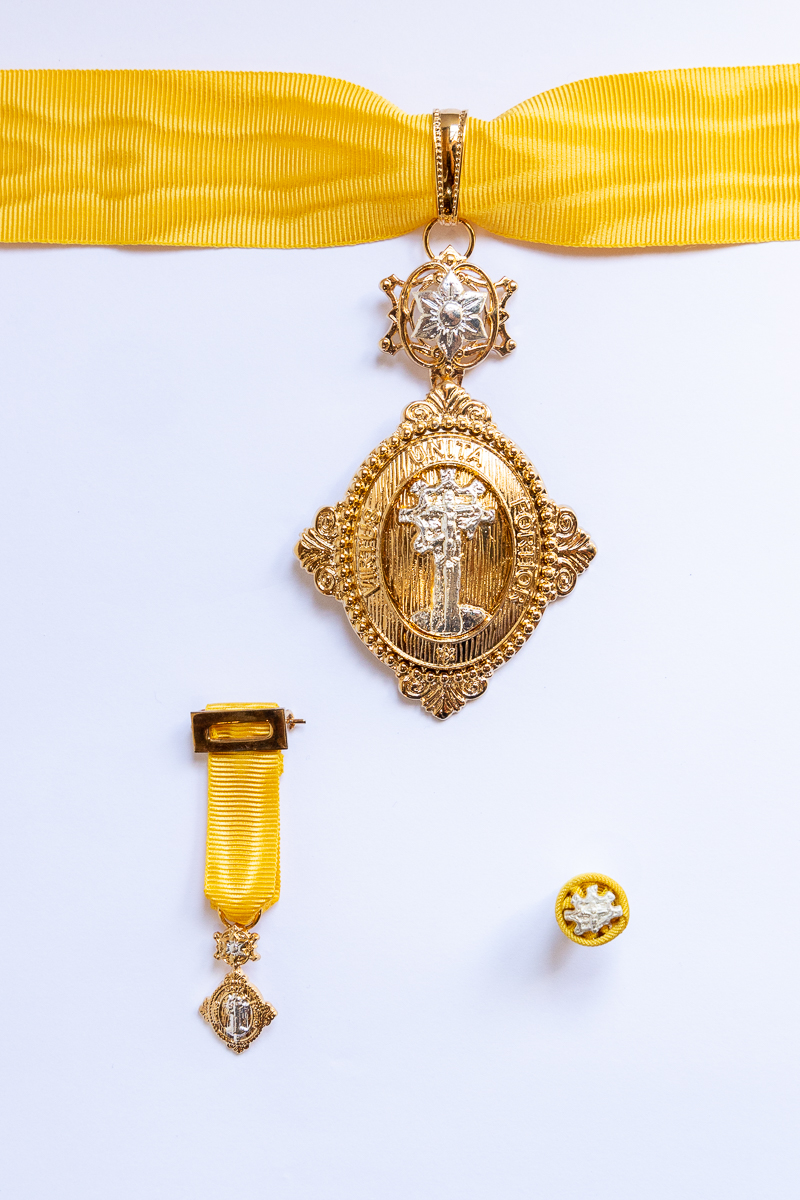
- Awarded for: Civil Merit
- Motto: Virtus Unita Fortior (United Virtue is Stronger)
- Established: 12th May 2022
- Ribbon bar

Precedence
- Next (higher): None (highest)
- Next (lower): Order of Charlemagne

The Cross of the Seven Arms is the highest distinction of the Principality of Andorra.

The objective of the order is to reward persons living or dead, as well as entities, that have contributed significantly to benefit Andorra, such as promoting its economic, scientific, and social standing, as well as promoting the dissemination of Andorran history and culture.

The Cross of Seven Arms is regulated by Decree 221/2024, of 29-5-2024, which approved the Regulation of the Cross of the Seven Arms.

== History ==
The order was the idea of Josep Dallerès, general syndic of the assembly during the term of the Social Democratic Party from 2009 to 2011. However, his idea did not come to fruition. It remained in the idea phase despite the best efforts of Vicenç Mateu and Mònica Bonell, syndic and sub-syndic from 2011 to 2019, who maintained the idea for the creation of a new order of esteem above the defunct Order of Charlemagne, but it was not until the term of Roser Suñé, syndic from 2019 to 2023, that the distinction was finally created, being established by chapter VIII of the 2022 law on Protocol and Ceremonial, prepared by the General Council with external collaboration.

The name of the order references an old wayside cross, the eponymous Cross of Seven Arms, situated on the road between the towns of Canillo and Prats, which is the subject of a local legend:

According to legend, in the town of Prats, there lived a somewhat scared boy who trembled just thinking that the devil could come to him one day. The young men of the village came up with the wicked idea of sending him to Canillo to get wine in exchange for inviting him to have a snack and to give him a great fright on his way. He resisted this endeavour, and to assuage his fears, they gave him a shotgun and sent him to Canillo.

When he arrived in Canillo, it was already beginning to get dark. He went to collect the wine, and, as there were many people in the inn, he left the shotgun and the barrel and took a walk around the village. When the innkeeper had dismissed all the customers, he filled the boy's wine barrel and curiously took a look at the gun when he saw that it was badly loaded. Believing that it was a mistake, he corrected it, lest the owner of the shotgun should have to defend himself from an animal and the weapon fail to fire.

The boy picked up the barrel and shotgun and took the road back to Prats. Meanwhile, his friends had a surprise in store for him... Suddenly, a white shape appeared, gesturing in the middle of the road. The boy didn't hesitate, shot the figure, and hurried home, screaming that the devil had died. The rest of the boys mocked him and urged him to return to the place to see the dead devil. When they arrived, they found that their friend had disappeared and that the devil had taken him. They had been punished for their wickedness.

In the place where this story happened, it was decided to put a cross so that passers-by would not forget the consequences of such an ugly act. The cross had seven arms, as there were seven young men who wanted to make fun of the boy. One of them disappeared, and, by strange coincidence, the cross also lost one of its arms.

== Governance of the Order ==
The order is governed by the Council of the Cross of the Seven Arms, which is responsible for the awarding of the order.

The order is headed by two grandmasters, the Co-princes. The council is composed of the Syndic General, the Prime Minister, and an Andorran Citizen, elected by the other members of the council every four years. The Minister of Exterior is the secretary of the order: they participate in the meetings of the Council, but are unable to vote. In accordance with the Law, the institutional positions that are part of the council, save for the Andorran citizen, may delegate their functions to a representative.

Presidents		Members			Secretary
Episcopal Co-Prince	French Co-Prince	Syndic general	Prime Minister	Andorran Citizen's Representative	Minister of the Exterior
Josep-Lluís Serrano Pentinat	Emmanuel Macron	Carles Ensenyat Reig	Xavier Espot Zamora	Vacant	Imma Tor Faus

== Insignia ==
The order is awarded in a single degree, that of a collar, similar to other high orders such as the Order of the Garter. When the order is given to an entity that has a banner, it is awarded in the form of a streamer that shall be attached to said banner. Additionally, if the person honoured is deceased, the award is given in the form of a plaque of honour.

- Collar

The Collar of the order is composed of a double chain, 800 mm in length, which is made up of sixteen links, of 35 mm by 35 mm, eight of the links represent the pendant of the collar, four of these depict Christ, and the other four depict the Lady of Meritxell, Patron Saint of Andorra in silver, in the extremes are narcissus flowers. the other eight represent floral motifs found on frescoes in the lobby of the Casa de la Vall. The chain is completed at the back by a 60 mm x 35 mm link, representing one of the locks on the Armoire of the Seven Keys.

in the centre of the collar is a depiction of the Coat of arms of Andorra, which is crowned and in gold, and is 45 mm. The pendant is suspended from a Hexafoil, with a silver narcissus at its centre. The pendant itself is in the form of an oval, 60 mm by 45 mm, pointed with Rococo-style ends, and in the centre is a depiction of the seven-armed cross in silver. surrounding this are the words VIRTVS VNITA FORTIOR, the national motto of Andorra.

- Necklet

The pendant of the Cross of the Seven Arms can be worn on less solemn occasions around the neck by the knights of the Cross of the Seven Arms in the form of a Necklet. It is suspended from a ribbon of yellow silk moiré 30 mm wide. The ladies of the Cross of the Seven Arms may wear it on bow, also in yellow, on the right chest.

- Miniature and Lapel pin

The set is accompanied by an 18 mm by 30 mm miniature medal reproducing the elements of the necklet and its Narcissus suspension in a Hexafoil with an ornate base, hanging from a 12 mm wide yellow ribbon. Additionally, it is accompanied by a lapel pin, in the centre of which there is a representation of the Cross of the Seven Arms upon the rosette.

- Plaque of Honour

The Plaque of Honour is made of silver on a wooden base. It is 355x250mm, and consists of a representation of the pendant with the name of the recipient and the date of receipt inscribed below, unlike the awards for living persons, it is a non-portable table medal.

== Awarding ==
The order must be awarded at least every two years. Its awarding must be published by the Official Bulletin of the Principality of Andorra, in the form of a decree, and the Chancellery issues a certificate

The order is automatically granted to Co-princes, Former Syndics General, and Prime Ministers.

== Revocation ==
The distinction of the Cross of the Seven Arms may be revoked by its Council when there are proven facts about the dishonourable conduct, public or private, of the recipient. When the council has decided to revoke an award, its decision shall be published in the national bulletin.

== Members of the Cross of Seven Arms ==
The first list of members of the Cross of the Seven Arms was published on 17 July 2024, in application of the provisions relating to the automatic awarding of the decoration.

- Joan Enric Vives i Sicília, Co-prince of Andorra, 17 July 2024.
- Emmanuel Macron, Co-prince of Andorra, 17 July 2024.
- Francesc Cerqueda Pascuet, General Syndic (1982–1990), 17 July 2024.
- Albert Gelabert Grau, General Syndic (1991–1992), 17 July 2024.
- Jordi Farràs Forné, General Syndic (1992–1994), 17 July 2024.
- Josep Dallerès Codina, General Syndic (1994–1997), (2009–2011), 17 July 2024.
- Marc Forné Molné, Prime Minister (1994–1997), (1997–2001), (2001–2005), 17 July 2024.
- Francesc Areny Casal, General Syndic (1997–2005), 17 July 2024.
- Albert Pintat Santolària, Prime Minister (2005–2009), 17 July 2024.
- Joan Gabriel Estany, General Syndic (2005–2009), 17 July 2024.
- Jaume Bartumeu Cassany, Prime Minister (2009–2011), 17 July 2024.
- Vicenç Mateu Zamora, General Syndic (2011–2019), 17 July 2024.
- Roser Suñé Pascuet, General Syndic (2019–2023), 17 July 2024.

Plaque of Honour

- Òscar Ribas Reig, posthumous, Prime Minister (1982–1984), (1990–1994), 17 July 2024.
- Josep Pintat Solans, posthumous, Prime Minister (1984–1990), 17 July 2024.
- Antoni Martí Petit, posthumous, Prime Minister (2011–2015), (2015–2019), 17 July 2024.
