= List of Andorrans =

Andorrans who are notable include:

== Officials ==
- Roser Bastida Areny (born 1955), member of the General Council of Andorra
- Lídia Armengol i Vila, (1948–1991), Deputy Secretary General of the Presidency
- Jaume Bartumeu Cassany (born 1954), lawyer, Head of Government candidate for the Social Democratic Party (Andorra), head of the parliamentary opposition
- Joan Benlloch i Vivó (1864–1926), bishop of Urgell and Catalan co-prince, wrote Andorra's national anthem
- Carles Blasi Vidal (born 1964), member of the General Council of Andorra
- Josep Maria Farré Naudi, politician
- Bernadeta Gaspà Bringueret (born 1965), member of the General Council of Andorra
- Guillem d'Areny-Plandolit (1822–1876), leader of the 1866 New Reform, member of the General Council of Andorra
- Ricard de Haro Jiménez, politician
- Julian Vila Coma, Ambassador to the United Nations
- Maria Pilar Riba Font, sat on the General Council, 2005–2011
- Antoni Martí (born 1963), Head of Government of Andorra since 2011
- Marc Forné Molné, Head of Government of Andorra, 1994–2005
- Albert Pintat (born 1943), Head of Government of Andorra, 2005–2011
- Maria Reig Moles (born 1951), Andorran entrepreneur
- Julià Reig Ribó (1911–1996), general councillor for the Valles de Andorra, 1948–1949; general syndic, 1960–1978
- Jordi Jordana Rossell (born 1960), politician
- Joan Albert Farré Santuré (born 1968), politician
- Boris de Skossyreff (1896–1989), Russian émigré, self-proclaimed "Boris I, King of Andorra" in 1934, before the Catalan co-prince intervened to restore order
- Pere Joan Tomas Sogero, businessman and diplomat
- Juli Minoves Triquell (born 1969), minister, diplomat, writer
- Esther Rabasa Grau, diplomat

== Arts and music ==
- Ana Arce (born 1964), photographer and former skip of Andorra's curling team
- Anonymous, band
- Lluís Claret (born 1951), cellist
- Persefone, progressive metal band
- Marta Roure (born 1981), singer
- Sylvia Steinbrecht, filmmaker

== Athletes ==
- Alex Antor (born 1979), alpine skier who represented Andorra at the 2006 Winter Olympics
- Ana Arce (born 1964), photographer and former skip of Andorra's curling team
- Marc Bernaus (born 1977), footballer
- Juli Fernández (born 1974), footballer
- Melissandre Fuentes (born 1988), figure skater
- Hocine Haciane, swimmer at the 2004 Summer Olympics
- Stéphanie Jiménez, high altitude athlete
- Koldo (born 1970), footballer, born in Vitoria-Gasteiz
- Ildefons Lima (born 1978), footballer
- Antoni Sivera (born 1978), footballer
- Oscar Sonejee (born 1976), footballer
- Laure Soulie (born 1987), biathlete

== Writers ==
- Josep Carles Laínez (born 1970), writer and journalist; lives in Encamp; writes for the newspaper El Periòdic d'Andorra
- Juli Minoves Triquell (born 1969), minister, diplomat, writer

== Others ==
- Pere Areny (1913–1943), convicted murderer, last person to be executed by Andorra

== See also ==
- List of Catalans
