= List of newspapers in Andorra =

Below is a list of newspapers published in Andorra. All newspapers in Andorra are written in the Catalan language

== Daily ==
- Altaveu (Andorra la Vella)
- Bondia
- Diari d'Andorra (Andorra la Vella)
- El Periòdic d'Andorra / El Periòdic (Escaldes-Engordany)
- La Veu Lliure (Escaldes-Engordany)

== Weekly ==
- 7dies

== See also ==
- List of Catalan-language newspapers (includes newspapers in other Catalan-speaking areas that are outside Andorra)
- List of newspapers
