= List of ambassadors to Luxembourg =

This is a list of ambassadors to Luxembourg. Note that some ambassadors are responsible for more than one country while others are directly accredited to Luxembourg.

== Current ambassadors to Luxembourg ==
Sending country	Presentation of the credentials	Location of resident embassy	Ambassador
Afghanistan		Brussels, Belgium	vacant
Albania	-	Brussels, Belgium	Ferit Hoxha
Algeria	28 August 2023	Brussels, Belgium	Mohamed El Amine Bencherif
Andorra	19 June 2019	Brussels, Belgium	Esther Rabasa Grau
Angola	29 October 2009	Brussels, Belgium	Elizabeth Simbrao de Carvalho
Argentina	8 June 2011	Brussels, Belgium	Juan Carlos Valle Raleigh
Armenia	October 20, 2020	Brussels, Belgium	Tigran Balayan
Austria	March 2024	Luxembourg, Luxembourg	Dr. Karin Proidl
Azerbaijan	26 August 2021	Brussels, Belgium	Vaqif Sadıqov
Bahrain	26 October 2022	Brussels, Belgium	Abdullah Faisal Al Dosari
Bangladesh	30 June 2020	Brussels, Belgium	Mahbub Hassan Saleh
Barbados	29 March 2019	Brussels, Belgium	Joy-Ann Skinner
Belarus		Brussels, Belgium	vacant
Belgium	12 September 2024	Luxembourg, Luxembourg	Charles Delogne
Belize	-	Brussels, Belgium	Gianni Tamella Avila
Benin	29 October 2009	Brussels, Belgium	Charles Borromée Todjinou
Bhutan	8 February 2024	Brussels, Belgium	Tshoki Choden
Bolivia	26 October 2022	Brussels, Belgium	Valeria Vilaseca Chumacero
Bosnia and Herzegovina	7 March 2024	Brussels, Belgium	Erol Avdović
Botswana	7 June 2023	Brussels, Belgium	Mmasekgoa Masire-Mwamba
Brazil	15 June 2022	Brussels, Belgium	João Mendes Pereira
Brunei Darussalam	26 March 2022	Brussels, Belgium	Adnan Mohammed Ja’Afar
Bulgaria	6 October 2020	Brussels, Belgium	Plamen Bonchev
Burkina Faso	26 October 2023	Brussels, Belgium	Léopold Tonguenoma Bonkoungou
Burundi	2 October 2020	Brussels, Belgium	Thérence Ntahiraja
Cambodia	15 June 2022	Brussels, Belgium	Sakal Nong
Cameroon	2 June 2021	The Hague, Netherlands	Madeleine Liguemoh Ondoua
Canada		Brussels, Belgium	Nicholas Brousseau
Cape Verde	12 October 2022	Brussels, Belgium	Edna Maria Monteiro Marta Monteiro
Central African Republic	1 October 2015	Brussels, Belgium	Daniel Emery Dede
Chad	23 November 2023	Brussels, Belgium	Bachar Brahim Adoum
Chile	23 November 2022	Brussels, Belgium	Gloria Patricia de Jesus Navarrete Pinto
China	21 September 2022	Luxembourg, Luxembourg	Ning Hau
Colombia		Brussels, Belgium	Hernán Mauricio Cuervo Castellanos
Comoros	27 April 2022	Paris, France	Mohamed Chatur Badaoui
Congo	25 November 2009	Brussels, Belgium	Roger Julien Menga
Costa Rica	23 November 2023	Brussels, Belgium	Eliana Villalobos Cardenas
Côte d’Ivoire	20 January 2021	Brussels, Belgium	Abou Dosso
Croatia	12 February 2008	Brussels, Belgium	Boris Grigić
Cuba	29 February 2012	Brussels, Belgium	Mirtha Maria Hormilla Castro
Cyprus	15 September 2011	Brussels, Belgium	Athena Droushiotis-Mavronicola
Czech Republic	11 February 2020	Luxembourg, Luxembourg	Vladimir Bärtl
Democratic Republic of Congo	18 January 2023	Brussels, Belgium	Christian Ndongala Nkuku
Denmark	2024	Brussels, Belgium	Susanne Shine
Djibouti	22 February 2023	Brussels, Belgium	Aden Mohamed Dileita
Dominica		Brussels, Belgium	vacant
Dominican Republic	27 April 2022	Brussels, Belgium	Ivan Emilio De Jesus Ogando Lora
Ecuador	18 October 2007	Brussels, Belgium	Fernando Yepez Lasso
Egypt	30 May 2018	Brussels, Belgium	Khaled Aly el Bakly
El Salvador	13 June 2024	Brussels, Belgium	Javier Helamán Reyes Menjivar
Eritrea	1 July 2015	Brussels, Belgium	Negassi Kassa Tekle
Equatorial Guinea	25 April 2024	Brussels, Belgium	Miguel Oyono Ndong Mifumu
Estonia	???	Brussels, Belgium	Helen Kaljuläte
Ethiopia	21 April 2021	Brussels, Belgium	Hirut Zemene Kassa
Fiji	20 May 2010	Brussels, Belgium	Peceli Vuniwaqa Vocea
Finland	22 February 2023	Brussels, Belgium	Jouko Leinonen
France	22 September 2021	Luxembourg, Luxembourg	Claire Lignières-Counathe
Gabon	10 February 2021	Brussels, Belgium	Serge Thierry Mickoto Chavagne
Gambia	22 March 2023	Brussels, Belgium	Pa Musa Jobarteh
Georgia	10 February 2022	Brussels, Belgium	Vakhtang Makharoblishvili
Germany	30 June 2023	Luxembourg, Luxembourg	Dr. Heike Peitsch
Ghana	n/a	Brussels, Belgium	vacant (September 2024)
Greece	19 June 2020	Luxembourg, Luxembourg	Angelos Ypsilantis
Grenada	7 December 2011	Brussels, Belgium	Stephen Fletcher
Guatemala	23 November 2023	Brussels, Belgium	José Gabriel Lambour Penalonzo
Guinea	21 September 2023	Brussels, Belgium	Aïssatou Doukouré
Guinea-Bissau	29 February 2012	Brussels, Belgium	Alfredo Lopes Cabral
Haiti	20 October 2010	Brussels, Belgium	Raymond Magloire
Honduras	2023	Brussels, Belgium	José Guadalupe Ruelas García
Holy See	16 March 2022	Brussels, Belgium	Franco Coppola
Hungary	30 January 2019	Brussels, Belgium	Tamás Iván Kovács
Iceland	27 January 2021	Brussels, Belgium	Kristján Andri Stefánsson
India	25 April 2024	Brussels, Belgium	Saurabh Kumar
Indonesia	24 March 2021	Brussels, Belgium	Andri Hadi
Iraq	21 September 2023	Brussels, Belgium	Ahmad Tahsin Ahmad Berwari
Iran	25 April 2024	Brussels, Belgium	Seyed Mohammad Ali Rbbatjazi
Ireland	21 September 2023	Luxembourg, Luxembourg	Jean McDonald
Israel	23 November 2022	Brussels, Belgium	Idit Rosenzweig-Abu
Italy	12 September 2024	Luxembourg, Luxembourg	Carmine Robustelli
Jamaica	15 June 2022	Brussels, Belgium	Symone Marie Betton-Nayo
Japan	26 October 2022	Brussels, Belgium	Matsubara Tadahiro
Jordan	7 December 2011	Brussels, Belgium	Montaser Oklah Alzoubi
Kazakhstan	10 February 2022	Brussels, Belgium	Baimukhan Margulan
Kenya	2022	Brussels, Belgium	Bitange Ndemo
Kyrgyzstan	13 June 2024	Brussels, Belgium	Aidit Erkin
Kosovo	18 January 2023	Brussels, Belgium	Agron Bajrami
Kuwait	22 March 2023	Brussels, Belgium	Nawaf Nafi Alenzi
Laos	8 February 2021	Brussels, Belgium	Kingphokeo Phommahaxay
Latvia	27 October 2011	Brussels, Belgium	Lelde Lice-Licite (Ambasador agréé); Sanita Pekale (Chargé d'Affaires a.i.)
Lebanon	13 June 2021	Brussels, Belgium	Fadi Hajali
Lesotho	2 June 2021	Brussels, Belgium	Pontšo Susan Matumelo Sekatle
Liberia	22 October 2015	Brussels, Belgium	Isaac Wehyee Nyenabo
Libya	3 February 2012	Brussels, Belgium	Mohamed A.H. Farhat (Chargé d'Affaires a.i.)
Lithuania	23 November 2023	Brussels, Belgium	Dainius Petras Kamaitis
Madagascar	21 April 2021	Brussels, Belgium	Jean Omer Beriziky
Malaysia	8 February 2024	Brussels, Belgium	Dato' Mohd Khalid Abbasi Bin Ab Razak Khan Abbas
Malawi	21 September 2022	Brussels, Belgium	Naomi Aretha Ngwira
Maldives	2 February 2012	Brussels, Belgium	Ali Husain Didi
Mali	22 March 2023	Brussels, Belgium	El Hadji Alhousseini Traore
Malta	23 November 2022	Brussels, Belgium	Clint Tanti
Mauritania	8 February 2024	Brussels, Belgium	Mohamed Mahmoud Ould Brahim Khlil
Mauritius	2 June 2021	Brussels, Belgium	Sutiawan Gunessee
Mexico	17 November 2021	Brussels, Belgium	Rogelio Granguillhome Morfin
Moldova	22 March 2023	Brussels, Belgium	Viorel Cibotaru
Monaco	26 October 2022	Brussels, Belgium	Frédéric Labarrère
Mongolia	27 April 2022	Brussels, Belgium	Luvsanvandan Bold
Montenegro	???	Brussels, Belgium	Ivan Leković
Morocco	13 June 2019	Brussels, Belgium	Mohammed Ameur
Mozambique	28 February 2019	Brussels, Belgium	Berta Celestino Cossa
Namibia	20 September 2007	Brussels, Belgium	Hanno Rumpf
Nepal	20 October 2021	Brussels, Belgium	Gahendra Rajbhandari
Netherlands	2024	Luxembourg, Luxembourg	Catharina Elisabeth Francina Lobbezoo
New Zealand	September 2020	Brussels, Belgium	Diana Reaich
Nicaragua	13 June 2019	Berlin, Germany	Tatiana Daniela García Silva
Niger	20 January 2021	Brussels, Belgium	Idé Alhassane
Nigeria	20 November 2008	Brussels, Belgium	Usman Alhaji Baraya
North Korea		London, UK	vacant
North Macedonia	7 June 2023	Brussels, Belgium	Metodija Beleski
Norway	10 February 2021	The Hague, Netherlands	Bård Ivar Svendsen
Oman	22 September 2021	The Hague, Netherlands	Abdullah bin Salim bin Hamed Al Harthi
Pakistan	26 October 2023	Brussels, Belgium	Amna Baloch
Panama	15 September 2011	Brussels, Belgium	Carlos Constantino Arosemena Ramos
Papua New Guinea	21 January 2015	Brussels, Belgium	Joshua Rimarkindo Kalinoe
Paraguay	???	Brussels, Belgium	Mario Sandoval Fernandez (Ambasador agréé); Enrique Miguel Franco Maciel (Chargé d'Affaires a.i.)
Peru	7 June 2023	Brussels, Belgium	Luis Enrique Chávez Basagoitia
Philippines	7 June 2023	Brussels, Belgium	Jaime Victor B. Ledda
Poland	8 February 2017	Luxembourg, Luxembourg	Piotr Wojtczak
Portugal	18 January 2023	Luxembourg, Luxembourg	Mário Pedro de Sousa Cameira Abreu de Almeida
Qatar	27 April 2021	Brussels, Belgium	Khalid Fahad A.A. AL-HAJRI
Romania	16 November 2011	Luxembourg, Luxembourg	Roxana Daniela Iftimie
Russia	20 January 2021	Luxembourg, Luxembourg	Dmitry Lobanov (Note: The Luxembourgish foreign ministry expelled 1 of the six staff in the Russian embassy in 2022 after the Bucha massacre. The ministry did not reveal the identity of the person that was ordered to leave the country.)
Rwanda	30 may 2018	Brussels, Belgium	Amandin Rugira
San Marino	26 June 2012	Paris, France	Fabio Morvilli
Sao Tome and Principe	25 November 2009	Brussels, Belgium	Carlos Gustavo dos Anjos
Saudi Arabia	3 March 2020	Brussels, Belgium	Khaled bin Ibrahim Al-Jandan
Senegal	26 October 2022	Brussels, Belgium	Baye Moctar Diop
Serbia	30 May 2018	Brussels, Belgium	Aleksander Tasic
Seychelles	24 April 2024	Brussels, Belgium	Kenneth Racombo
Sierra Leone	29 March 2019	Brussels, Belgium	Samuel Tamba Musa
Singapore	22 September 2021	Brussels, Belgium	Lim Hong Huai
Slovakia	30 January 2019	Brussels, Belgium	Peter Kormúth
Slovenia	30 May 2018	Brussels, Belgium	Rado Genorio
South Africa	2 June 2021	Brussels, Belgium	Tokozile Xasa
South Korea	12 September 2024	Brussels, Belgium	Chun Young-hee
Sovereign Military Order of Malta	23 November 2022	Vienna, Austria	Clint Tanti
Spain	12 October 2022	Brussels, Belgium	José María Rodríguez Coso
Sri Lanka	13 November 2019	Brussels, Belgium	Grace Asirwatham
Sudan	28 March 2012	Brussels, Belgium	Eltigani Salih Fidail
Eswatini	28 February 2019	Brussels, Belgium	Sibusisiwe Mngomezulu
Sweden	19 January 2012	Stockholm, Sweden	n/a
Switzerland	21 September 2022	Luxembourg, Luxembourg	Markus Börlin
Syria	2 March 2011	Brussels, Belgium	Mohammad Ayman J. Soussan
Tajikistan	June 2023	Brussels, Belgium	Useinzoda Muzaffar Mahmurod
Tanzania	23 November 2023	Brussels, Belgium	Jestas Abouk Nyamanga
Thailand	???	Brussels, Belgium	Kanchana Patarachoke
Timor-Leste	7 June 2023	Brussels, Belgium	Jorge Trindade Neves de Camões
Togo	24 May 2005	Brussels, Belgium	Félix Kodjo Sagbo
Tonga	25 September 2020	London, UK	Titilupe Fanetupouvava'u Tuita-Tupou Tu'ivakano
Trinidad and Tobago	9 October 2018	Brussels, Belgium	Colin Connelly
Tunisia	23 November 2023	Brussels, Belgium	Sahbi Khalfallah
Turkey	22 February 2023	Luxembourg, Luxembourg	Engin Yürür
Turkmenistan	22 March 2023	Brussels, Belgium	Sapar Palvanov
Uganda	21 May 2014	Brussels, Belgium	Mirjam Blaak
Ukraine	-	Brussels, Belgium	Ronald Dofing
United Arab Emirates	21 September 2021	Brussels, Belgium	Mohamed Ismail Hussain Al Sahlawi Al-A
United Kingdom	21 April 2021	Luxembourg, Luxembourg	Fleur Thomas
United States	23 December 2021	Luxembourg, Luxembourg	Tom Barrett
Uruguay	22 February 2023	Brussels, Belgium	Pablo Ader
Uzbekistan	2 February 2012	Brussels, Belgium	Bakhtiyar Gulyamov
Venezuela	29 April 2010	Brussels, Belgium	Antonio Guillermo Garcia Danglades
Vietnam	17 November 2021	Brussels, Belgium	Van Thao Nguyen
Yemen	19 October 2017	Brussels, Belgium	Mohamed Taha Mustafa
Zambia	21 September 2023	Brussels, Belgium	Sylvester Mundana
Zimbabwe	27 April 2022	Brussels, Belgium	Ammon Mutembwa

== See also ==
- Foreign relations of Luxembourg
- List of diplomatic missions of Luxembourg
- List of diplomatic missions in Luxembourg
