= Josep Dallerès Codina =

Andorran politician

General Syndic of General Council
- Monarchs: Episcopal Co-prince: Joan Martí i Alanis; Joan Enric Vives Sicília; French Co-prince: François Mitterrand; Jacques Chirac; Nicolas Sarkozy
- Representative: Episcopal: Nemesi Marquès i Oste; French: Jean-Yves Caullet; Pierre de Bousquet de Florian; Christian Frémont
- In office January 19, 1994 – March 10, 1997
- Preceded by: Jordi Farràs Forné
- Succeeded by: Francesc Areny Casal
- In office May 19, 2009 – April 28, 2011
- Preceded by: Joan Gabriel i Estany
- Succeeded by: Vicenç Mateu Zamora

Personal details
- Born: 14 February 1949 (age 76); Vilafranca del Penedès, Spain
- Political party: Social Democratic Party

Josep Dallerès Codina (born 14 February 1949) is an Andorran politician who served as General Syndic of the General Council from 1994 to 1997, and 2009 to 2011, as a member of the Social Democratic Party.

Born in Vilafranca del Penedès, Spain, Dallerès was the son of two Andorran parents who moved back to Andorra. He became a teacher and his poetry was first published Flammes Vives in 1967. He switched his writing language from French to Catalan after meeting Maria Aurèlia Capmany and Jaume Vidal Alcover.

== Early life ==
Josep Dallerès Codina was born in Vilafranca del Penedès, Spain, on 14 February 1949, to parents from Andorra. His family returned to Andorra and he was raised in Pontons. He was educated at a French school in Encamp and later became a teacher at Lycée Comte de Foix.

== Career ==
Dallerès's poetry was first published in the French magazine Flammes Vives from 1967 to 1968. Maria Aurèlia Capmany and Jaume Vidal Alcover, who Dallerès met while working on the Posobra magazine, convinced him to start writing in Catalan.

From 1982 to 1991, Dallerès was the Minister of Culture for Encamp. Dallerès was a member of the General Council from 1992 to 2011, and was General Syndic from 1994 to 1997, and 2009 to 2011. He was Minister of Education, Culture and Youth at the national level from 1991 to 1993. He was president of the National Commission of Andorra at UNESCO and was the country's representative to the Council of Europe from 2011 to 2015.

The French embassy to Andorra awarded Dallerès as Commander of the Legion of Honour. Seven books of poetry by him have been published as of 2022.

== Works ==
- Frontera endins (2007)

== Works cited ==
=== News ===
- Martin, Esther (14 October 2015). "Josep Dallerès". El Periòdic d'Andorra. Archived from the original on 25 April 2025.
- Puigbò, Roser (20 March 2022). "L'escriptor Josep Dallerès presenta el seu setè llibre de poesia". Radio and Television of Andorra. Archived from the original on 25 April 2025.

=== Web ===
- "30th anniversary of the Congress of Local and Regional Authorities". Council of Europe. 27 March 2024. Archived from the original on 25 April 2025.
- "Biography". Associació d'Escriptors en Llengua Catalana. Archived from the original on 25 April 2025.
- "Josep Dallerès Codina". General Council. Archived from the original on 25 April 2025.
