= Reig =

Reig may refer to:

- Alba Reig, a member of the music group Sweet California
- Andreu Blanes Reig (born 1991), Spanish orienteering competitor
- Ben Reig (died 1968), American fashion businessman
- Howard Reig (1921–2008), American radio and television announcer
- Òscar Ribas Reig, (1936–2020), Andorran politician, lawyer, and businessman
- Osvaldo Reig (1929–1992), Argentine biologist and paleontologist
- Rafael Reig (born 1963), Spanish writer
- Rubén Reig (born 1986), Spanish racing cyclist
- Teddy Reig (1918–1984), American music producer and promoter
- Enrique Reig y Casanova (1858–1927), archbishop of Toledo and Primate of Spain
- Nelly Reig Castellanos (1929–2021), First Lady of Paraguay from 1989 to 1993
- Maria Reig Moles (born 1951), Andorran entrepreneur
- Julià Reig Ribó (1911–1996), Andorran politician
- Antoni Reig Ventura (born 1932), Valencian pilotari

== See also ==
- Reig's grass mouse South American rodent
- Reig's montane mouse, Venezuelan rodent
- Reig's opossum, South American opossum
- Reig's tuco-tuco, Argentine rodent
