= Jana Heczková-Madajová =

Slovak ski mountaineer and fell runner

Personal information
- Born: May 4, 1967 (age 59)

Sport
- Sport: Skiing
- Club: SK Žiarska dolina

Jana Madajová (born Lazarová), née Lazarová (born May 4, 1967), of the SK Žiarska dolina is a Slovak ski mountaineer and fell runner.

== Selected results ==
=== Ski mountaineering ===
- 1998:
  - 2nd, Patrouille des Glaciers (together with Claudine Trécourt and Alexia Zuberer)
- 2000:
  - 2nd, Psotkov memoriál
  - 2nd, Tatranská magistrála
- 2001:
  - 5th, European Championship team race (together with Miroslava Paliderová)
- 2002:
  - 6th, World Championship team race (together with Miroslava Paliderová)
  - 6th, European Championship single race
  - 9th, European Championship combination ranking

==== Pierra Menta ====
- 1995: 1st, together with Tatiana Moskova
- 1996: 1st, together with Tatiana Moskova
- 1997: 3rd, together with Isabel Rogé Tartarini
- 1998: 3rd, together with Corinne Favre

=== Sky running ===
- 2000:
  - 1st Sentiero 4 Luglio SkyMarathon half marathon
