= Josep Maria Beal =

Andorran politician (died 2019)

Josep Maria Beal i Benedico (died 23 November 2019) was an Andorran politician who served as General Syndic (Speaker) of the General Council from 12 January 1990 until 15 February 1991, when he resigned after suffering from a disease that would lead to him becoming a wheelchair user. He abandoned the first line of politics until 2003, when he was candidate in the 2003 local elections, but was unsuccessful in getting elected.

Between 1984 and 1989 he served as Cònsol Major (Mayor) of Escaldes-Engordany and promoted the Caldea spa.

He was considered a key figure as one of the promotors of the constituent process that ended with the approval of the Constitution in 1993. His last public appearance was in the acts of celebration of the 25 years of the Constitution in March 2018.

Beal died on 23 November 2019 at the age of 77. His funeral was held on 25 November and was attended by the Prime Minister Xavier Espot and the current General Syndic Roser Suñé Pascuet, among other important representatives.
