= 2007 Skyrunning European Championships =

- Host city: Poschiavo
- Country: Switzerland
- Events: SkyRace
- Opening: June 10, 2007
- Closing: June 10, 2007
- Website: skyrunning.com

The 2007 Skyrunning European Championships was the 1st edition of the global skyrunning competition, Skyrunning European Championships, organised by the International Skyrunning Federation and was held in Poschiavo (Switzerland), took place on 10 June 2007, coinciding with the International SkyRace Valmalenco-Valposchiavo, from Valmalenco, Sondrio (Italy) to Valposchiavo, Switzerland.

== Results ==
The race of the International SkyRace Valmalenco-Valposchiavo (31 km, +1850m/-1800m) was the only competition with 488 athletes who reached the finish line of both sexes and nations (including non-European ones). obviously the medals of the European Championships were awarded by compiling single rankings, male and female, and not including non-European athletes.

=== Men's SkyRace ===
Rank	Athlete	Country	Time
1st place, gold medalist(s)	Marco De Gasperi	Italy	2:32:03
2nd place, silver medalist(s)	Helmut Schiessl	Germany	2:37:48
3rd place, bronze medalist(s)	Dennis Brunod	Italy	2:40:49
4	Mikhail Mamleev	Italy	2:41:06
5	Kilian Jornet Burgada	Spain	2:41:42
6	Aires Sousa	Portugal	2:44:16
7	Fulvio Dapit	Italy	2:46:33
8	Carlos Silva	Portugal	2:46:54
9	Tom Owens	United Kingdom	2:46:58
10	Fabio Bnfanti	Italy	2:49:22

=== Women's SkyRace ===
Rank	Athlete	Country	Time
1st place, gold medalist(s)	Pierangela Baronchelli	Italy	3:21:07
2nd place, silver medalist(s)	Rosa Madureira	Portugal	3:21:33
3rd place, bronze medalist(s)	Stéphanie Jiménez	Andorra	3:26:51
4	Corinne Favre	France	3:27:04
5	Manuela Brizio	Italy	3:29:27
6	Daniela Vassalli	Italy	3:35:51
7	Lucinda Moreiras	Portugal	3:37:33
8	Gloriana Pellissier	Italy	3:39:58
9	Gisella Bendotti	Italy	3:40:08
10	Raffaella Rossi	Italy	3:43:41
