= List of general syndics of the General Council =

List of general syndics of the General Council of the Valleys (Andorra). The general syndic is the speaker of the Andorran parliament. Roser Suñé Pascuet, on April 3, 2019, became the first woman to hold the office of General Syndic in Andorra's history.

== Officeholders ==
Name	Entered office	Left office	Party
Jordi Farràs Forné	May 4, 1993	January 19, 1994	PD
Josep Dallerès Codina	January 19, 1994	March 10, 1997	PSA
Francesc Areny Casal	March 10, 1997	May 17, 2005	PLA
Joan Gabriel i Estany	May 17, 2005	May 19, 2009	PLA
Josep Dallerès Codina	May 19, 2009	April 28, 2011	PSA
Vicenç Mateu Zamora	April 28, 2011	May 3, 2019	DA
Roser Suñé Pascuet	April 3, 2019	April 26, 2023	DA
Carles Enseñat Reig	April 26, 2023	Present	DA

== See also ==
- List of first syndics of the General Council
