= List of Catalan-language newspapers =

This is a list of newspapers published in the Catalan language.

Name	Description	Distribution	Online edition
National newspapers
Ara	General	Catalan-speaking regions	https://www.ara.cat/
Diari de Girona	General and local	Girona	https://www.diaridegirona.cat/
Diari Segre	General and local	Lleida	https://www.segre.com/
L'Esportiu	Sports	Catalonia	https://www.lesportiudecatalunya.cat
El Periódico	General	Catalonia	https://www.elperiodico.cat/ca/
El Punt Avui	General	Catalan-speaking regions	https://www.elpuntavui.cat/barcelona.html
Regió7	General	Catalonia	https://www.regio7.cat
La Vanguardia	General	Catalonia	https://www.lavanguardia.cat/
Online newspapers
Agència Catalana de Notícies	General	Catalonia	https://www.acn.cat/
324	General	Catalonia	https://www.324.cat/
El Nacional	General	Catalonia	https://www.elnacional.cat/
Catalunya Diari	General	Catalonia	https://www.catalunyadiari.cat/
Catalunya Plural	General	Catalonia	https://www.catalunyaplural.cat/
Catalunya Press	General	Catalonia	https://www.catalunyapress.cat/
Crític	Investigative	Catalan-speaking regions	https://www.elcritic.cat
dBalears	General	Balearic Islands	https://www.dBalears.cat/
El Diari de l'Educació	Education	Catalonia	https://www.diarieducacio.cat
Ecodiari	Ecology	Catalan-speaking regions	https://www.ecodiari.cat
E-Notícies	General	Catalonia	https://www.e-noticies.cat/
Esport 3	Sports	Catalonia	https://www.esport3.cat
Jornal	Economy	Catalan-speaking regions	https://www.jornal.cat
Vilaweb	General	Catalan-speaking regions	https://www.vilaweb.cat/
IB3notícies	General	Balearic Islands	https://www.ib3noticies.cat/
La Veu	General	Valencian Community	https://www.laveupv.com/
La República	General	Catalan-speaking regions	https://www.larepublica.cat/
El Món	General	Catalonia	https://www.elmon.cat/
Nació Digital	General	Catalan-speaking regions	https://www.naciodigital.cat/
Regional Newspapers
Ara Balears	General and local	Balearic Islands	https://www.arabalears.cat/
Diari d'Andorra	General and local	Andorra	https://www.diariandorra.ad/
La Ciutat	General and local	Tarragona	https://www.laciutat.cat
La Clau	Local	Northern Catalonia	https://www.la-clau.net/ca/
El 9 Nou	Local	Osona	https://el9nou.cat/osona-ripolles/
Les Muntanyes	Local	Alcoi	https://www.lesmuntanyes.com
El Periòdic d'Andorra	General and local	Andorra	https://www.elperiodic.ad/
El 3 de vuit	Local	Penedès	https://www.el3devuit.cat/
Tarragona Digital	Local	Tarragona	https://www.tarragonadigital.com
La Veu de l'Ebre	Local	Terres de l'Ebre	https://www.ebredigital.cat
