= Església de Sant Cristòfol d'Anyós =

Church in Anyós, Andorra

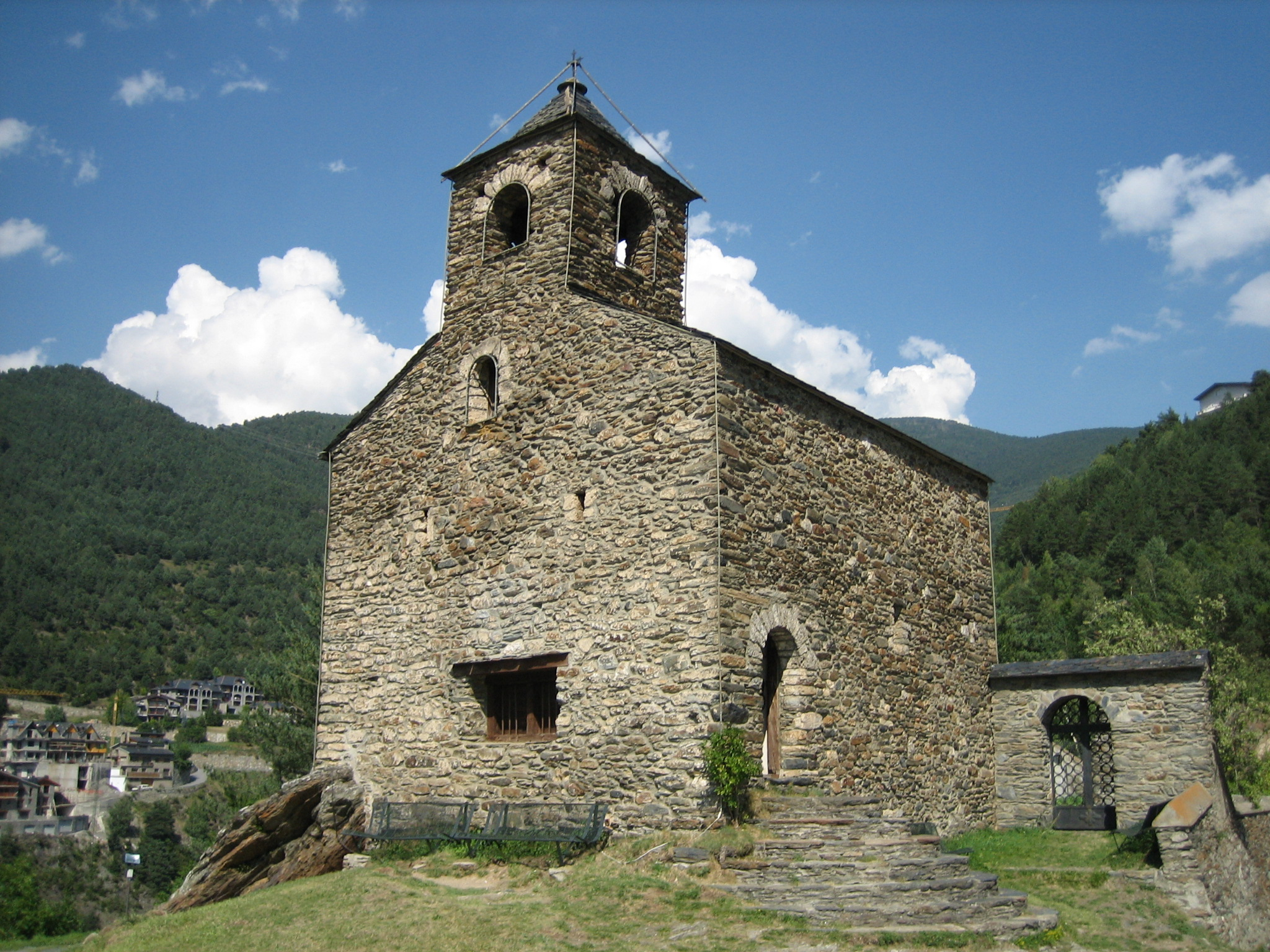
- Església de Sant Cristòfol d'Anyós
- 42°32′06″N 1°31′28″E
- Location: Anyós, Andorra
- Country: Andorra
- Denomination: Catholic Church
- Sui iuris church: Latin Church

Architecture
- Architectural type: Romanesque

Església de Sant Cristòfol d'Anyós is a church located in Anyós, La Massana, Andorra. Constructed in the 12th century, the church uses Romanesque architecture and features murals depicting the Last Supper and Saint Christopher. One of the murals which depicted Saint Peter, Saint Paul, and Mary, mother of Jesus, was taken in the 1930s and not rediscovered until 2023. In 2003, the church became a heritage property registered in the Cultural Heritage of Andorra.

== History ==
As Saint Christopher is the patron of drivers and travelers, cars are blessed at the church. The Cultural Heritage of Andorra listed the church as an asset of cultural interest on 16 July 2003.

== Structure ==
Constructed in the 12th century using Romanesque architecture, it is one of the smallest churches in Andorra, with its nave being 5 meters long and 4 meters wide. The walls are 0.85 meters thick. The entrance is located in the south wall. A small bell tower is on the west wall.

A large amount of changes have occurred over the building's existence and only the apse and north wall are mostly from the original construction. The original south and west walls were completely demolished and the nave was expanded.

== Murals ==
The murals in the church depict the Last Supper and Saint Christopher.

A mural from the church featuring Saint Peter, Saint Paul, and Mary, mother of Jesus was taken in the 1930s. Art historians Carles Mancho and Cristina Tarradellas started to search for the mural in 2020, and discovered it in a private French collection in 2023. According to Mancho and Tarradellas, after the mural was taken from the church it was sent to Barcelona, then to Madrid where Apolinar Sánchez Villalba acquired it, sold to somebody in the United States, and returned to Europe where it ended up in France in 1973.

== Works cited ==
=== News ===
- "Benedicció de vehicles a l'església de Sant Cristòfol". Diari d'Andorra. 11 July 2019. Archived from the original on 29 April 2025.
- "Localitzen a França un fragment de les pintures murals arrencades de Sant Cristòfol d'Anyós". Altaveu. 12 December 2023. Archived from the original on 29 April 2025.
- Perez, Gabriel (13 December 2023). "Els actuals propietaris de les pintures d'Anyós les van comprar fa 50 anys de forma "lícita"". Altaveu. Archived from the original on 29 April 2025.

=== Web ===
- "Sant Cristòfol d'Anyós (La Maçana)". Gran Enciclopèdia Catalana. Archived from the original on 29 April 2025.
- "Church of Saint Christopher of Anyós". Cultural Heritage of Andorra. Archived from the original on 2 May 2012.
