= Carles Ensenyat Reig =

Andorran politician

The Most Excellent Carles Ensenyat Reig MP

General Syndic of the General Council of Andorra
- Incumbent
- Assumed office 26 April 2023
- Preceded by: Roser Suñé Pascuet

Personal details
- Born: 22 February 1985 (age 41) Andorra
- Party: Democrats for Andorra
- Spouse: Albert Batalla
- Children: 1
- Parent: Maria Reig Moles (mother)
- Education: HEC Paris

Carles Ensenyat Reig (born 20 February 1985) is an Andorran politician who serves in the General Council as a member of the Democrats for Andorra and has been the General Syndic since 2023.

Born in the wealthy Reig family as the son of Maria Reig Moles, Reig was educated at HEC Paris. He was elected to the General Council in 2009, and worked in the Ombudsman's office from 2011 to 2015. His great-uncle Julià Reig Ribó served as also served as syndic of the General Council.

== Early life ==
Carles Ensenyat Reig was born on 20 February 1985, as the only son of Maria Reig Moles. The Reig family are multi-millionaires and Maria holds a 20% stake in Creand. His grandfather Serafí Reig Ribó and mother both served in the General Council and his great-uncle Julià Reig Ribó served as syndic of the General Council. He graduated with a law and master's degree from HEC Paris in 2008.

== Career ==
Reig was elected to the in 2009, 2011, 2015, 2019, and 2023. He is a member of the Democrats for Andorra and president of the Democrats in the General Council.

During Reig's tenure he served on the Health and the Environment, Finance and Budget, Social Affairs, and Education, Culture, Youth and Sports committees, and was president of the Foreign Policy committee. He was the secretary of the Ombudsman's office from 2011 to 2015. He became General Syndic of the General Council on 26 April 2023.

== Personal life ==
Reig married Albert Batalla, who served as mayor of La Seu d'Urgell and in the Parliament of Catalonia, and adopted a child.

== Honours and decorations ==
Ribbon bar	Honour	Date and comment
	Grand Cross of the Order of Charlemagne	17 July 2024 – by right as General Syndic

== Works cited ==
=== Books ===
- Anton, Jordi (2024). Del Consell de la Terra al Consell Genera. General Council. ISBN 9789992052525.

=== News ===
- Casas, Josep (24 September 2024). "El hijo de Maria Reig crea una inmobiliaria en pleno naufragio del grupo familiar". El Nacional. Archived from the original on 22 April 2025.
- Casas, Josep (3 December 2023). "Los Reig se refugian en la política después de fracasar en los negocios". El Nacional. Archived from the original on 22 April 2025.
- Perez, Gabriel (17 September 2023). ""Amb algunes mesures sobre l'habitatge hem fet tard; no vam valorar el problema amb la seva força"". L'altaveu. Archived from the original on 22 April 2025.

=== Web ===
- "Carles Ensenyat Reig". General Council. Archived from the original on 22 April 2025.
- "Carles Enseñat Reig". General Council. Archived from the original on 22 April 2025.
