= List of first syndics of the General Council =

Until 1993, the first syndic was the speaker of the General Council of Andorra. Below is a list of office holders from 1841 until 1993:

Name	Entered office	Left office	Party
Josep Picart	1841	1847	
Bonaventura Riba (acting)	1847	1858	
Gil Areny	1858	1861	
Francesc Duran	1861	1865	
Joaquim de Riba	1865	28 May 1866	
Guillem d'Areny-Plandolit	28 May 1866	2 December 1867	
Nicolau Duedra	1 January 1870	31 December 1875	
Guillem Mora	1 January 1876	31 December 1877	
Bonaventura Moles	1 January 1878	8 December 1880	
Joan Pla Calvo	8 December 1880	10 March 1881	
Josep Palmitjavila	10 March 1881	10 June 1881	
Francesc Duran	14 July 1881	31 December 1883	
Josep Palmitjavila	1 January 1884	31 December 1885	
Francesc Duran	1 January 1886	16 April 1886	
Francesc Maestre	16 April 1886	26 March 1888	
Antoni Moles	26 March 1888	31 December 1897	
Bonaventura Maestre	20 November 1893	3 June 1899	
Josep Calva	3 June 1899	31 December 1901	
Bonaventura Maestre	1 January 1902	31 December 1905	
Pere Moles	1 January 1906	31 December 1911	
Bonaventura Moles	1 January 1912	17 May 1915	
Pere Font	17 May 1915	31 December 1917	
Josep Vilanova	1 January 1918	17 August 1920	
Josep Grepa (acting)	17 August 1920	20 October 1920	
Bonaventura Villarubia	20 October 1920	31 December 1923	
Pere Font	1 January 1924	31 December 1927	
Roc Pallares	1 January 1928	19 August 1933	
Vacant	19 August 1933	18 September 1933	
Pere Torres	18 September 1933	21 July 1936	
Francesc Molné Rogé	21 July 1936	31 December 1936	
Francesc Cairat Freixes	1 January 1937	31 December 1960	
Julià Reig Ribó	1 January 1961	30 December 1966	
Francesc Escudé Ferrero	30 December 1966	30 December 1972	
Julià Reig Ribó	30 December 1972	29 December 1978	
Estanislau Sangrá Font	29 December 1978	4 January 1982	
Francesc Cerqueda Pasquet	4 January 1982	12 January 1990	Lauredian Union
Josep Maria Beal Benedico	12 January 1990	15 February 1991	Social Democratic Party
Albert Gelabert	15 February 1991	12 April 1992	Liberal Party of Andorra
Jordi Farràs Forné	12 April 1992	4 May 1993	Democratic Party

== See also ==
- List of general syndics of the General Council
