= Bernadeta =

Bernadeta is female given name in France, Poland, Lithuania; female form of the name Bernard.

- Bernadeta Maria Bocek-Piotrowska (born 1970), Polish former cross country skier
- Bernadeta Gaspà Bringueret (born 1955), Andorran politician
- Bernadeta Sobiróus (1844–1879), firstborn daughter of a miller from Lourdes (France), venerated as a Christian mystic and Saint in the Catholic Church
