= Anyós =

Village in La Massana, Andorra

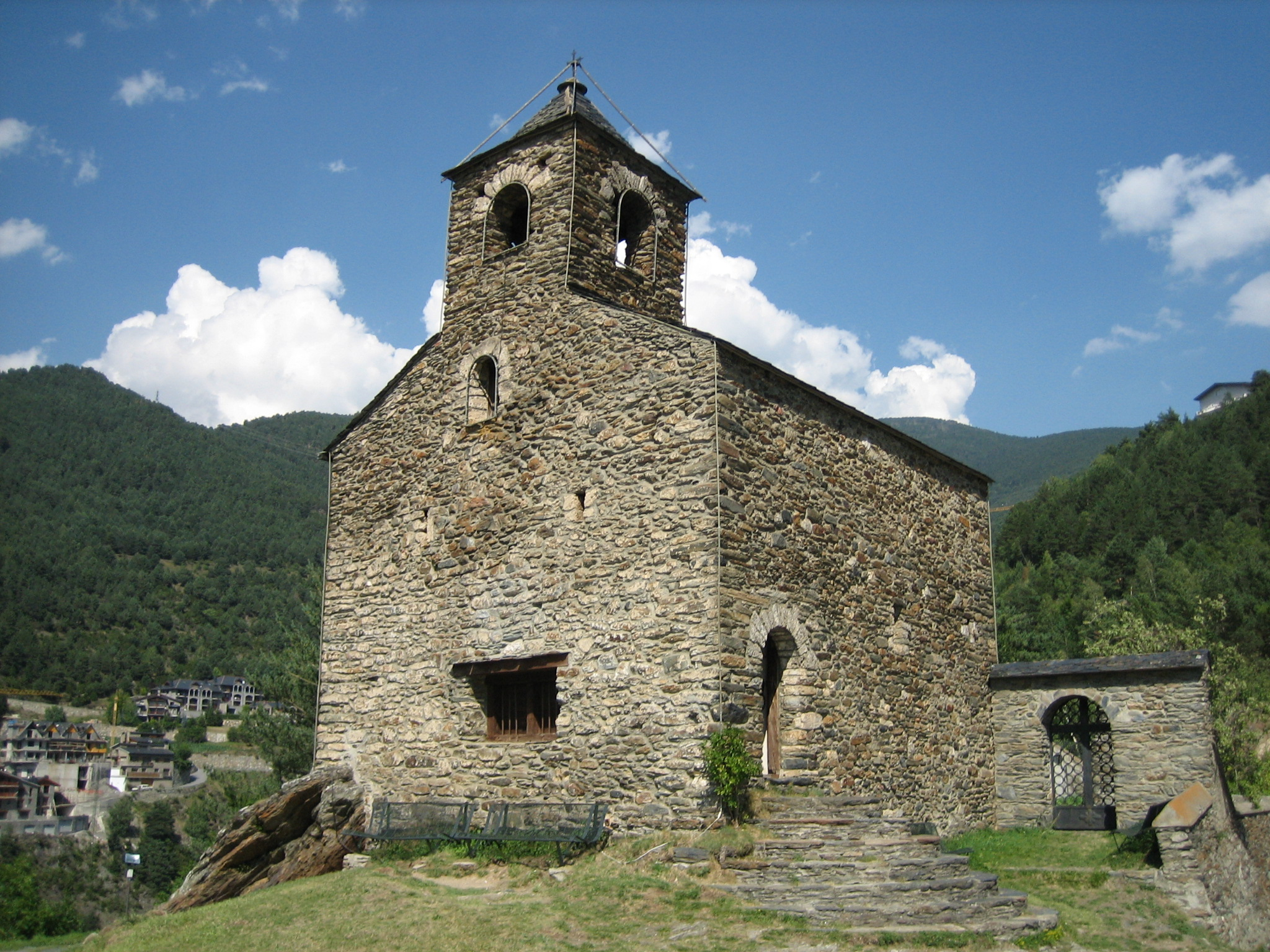
- 11th century Romanesque Church of St Christopher

- Location in Andorra
- Coordinates: 42°32′4.53″N 1°32′29.94″E
- Country: Andorra
- Parish: La Massana
- Elevation: 4,216 ft (1,285 m)

Population (2024)
  - Total: 1,047

Anyós (Catalan pronunciation: [aˈɲos]) is a village in the parish of La Massana, Andorra. It is the third-most populated place in the parish with 1,047 people and has experience a significant amount of population growth since the 2010s. The 12th century Romanesque church Església de Sant Cristòfol d'Anyós is located within Anyós and the village of Sispony is on the other side of the valley.

== Geography ==
Anyós is a village located within the parish of La Massana, in the country of Andorra. It is 1,307 meters above sea level and is between the Ordino and Anyós rivers. Anyós is on a mountain range and the village of Sispony is on the other side of the valley.

== History ==
The 12th century Romanesque church Església de Sant Cristòfol d'Anyós, which was recognized by the Cultural Heritage of Andorra as an asset of cultural heritage on 16 July 2003, is located within the village. The route of the 2021 Tour de France passed through the village.

40% of the people who acquired property in Anyós from 2021 to 2022, were from the Netherlands. The maximum number of urban construction allotted for Anyós in 2025, was almost completely used by February.

== Demographics ==
The population of Anyós rose by over 35% in the 2010s. The population of the village rose from 639 in 2010, to 1,047 in 2024. It is the third-most populated place in the parish behind Arinsal and La Massana.

== Transportation ==
Sections of the CG-2 and CG-3 main roads pass through the village.

== Gallery ==
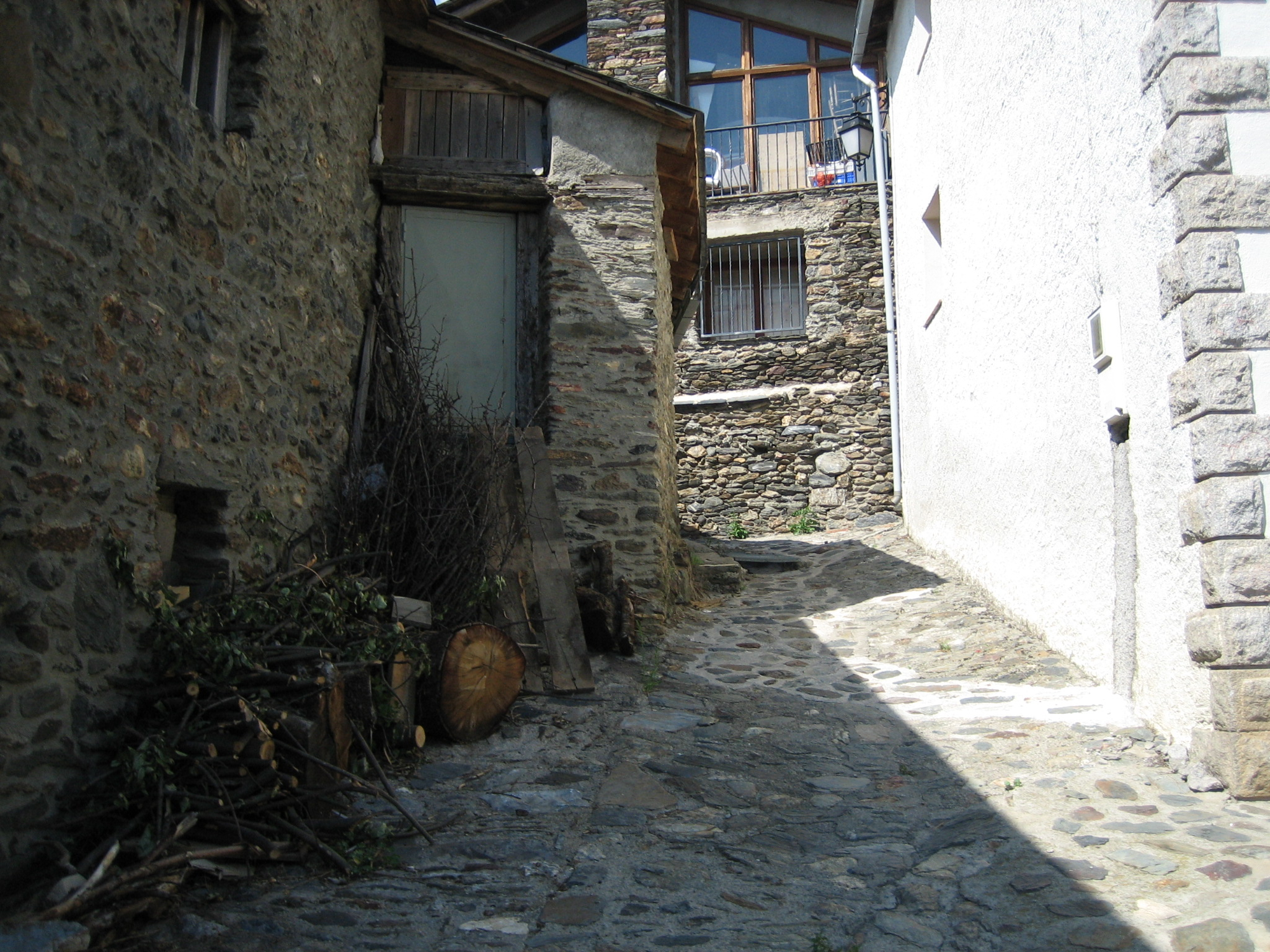
Anyós centre is composed of narrow cobbled streets (here: Camí de les Corts Noves)

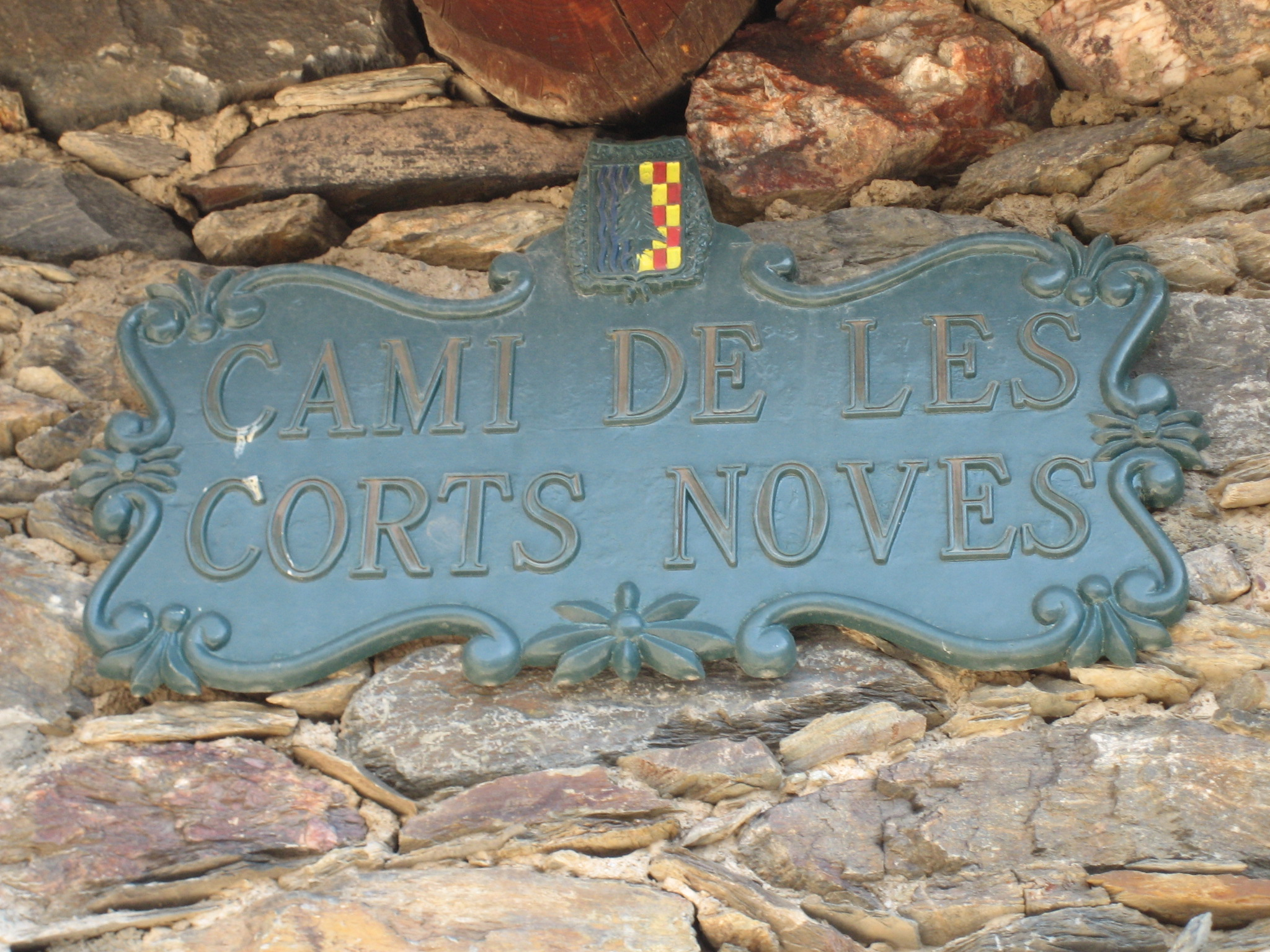
Street sign Camí de les Corts Noves

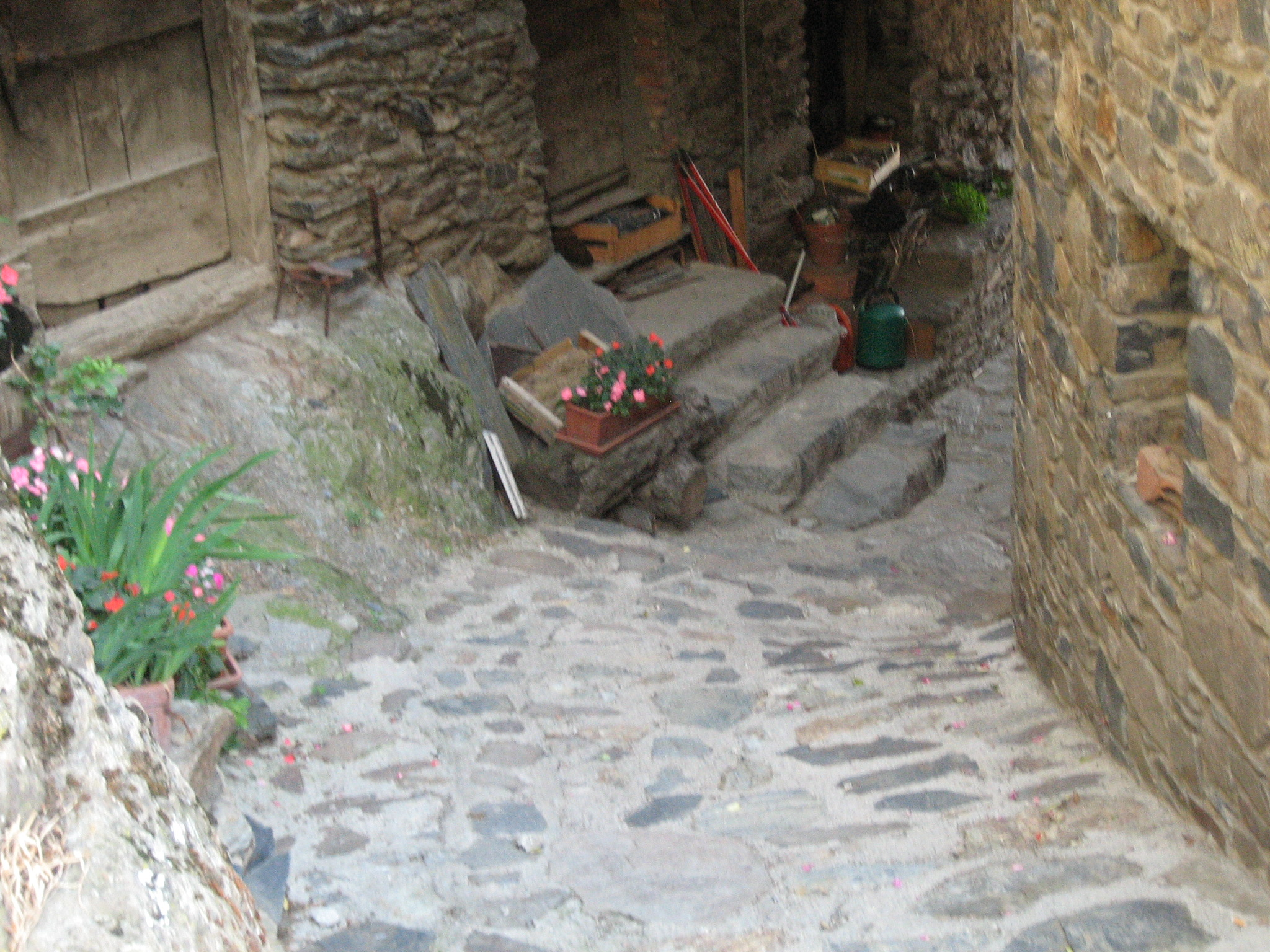
Camí del Querol

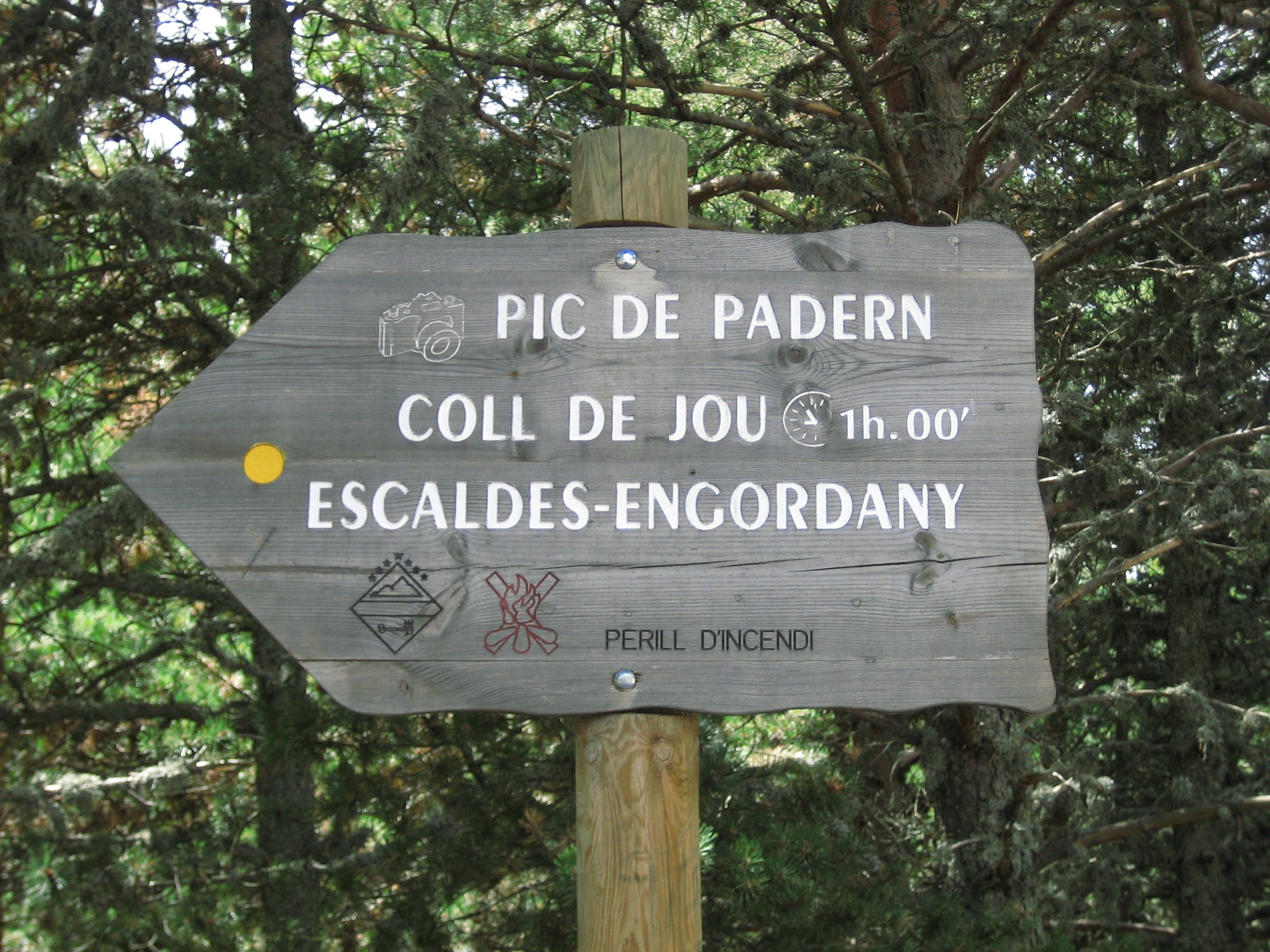
Hiking sign on the way to Pic de Padern summit

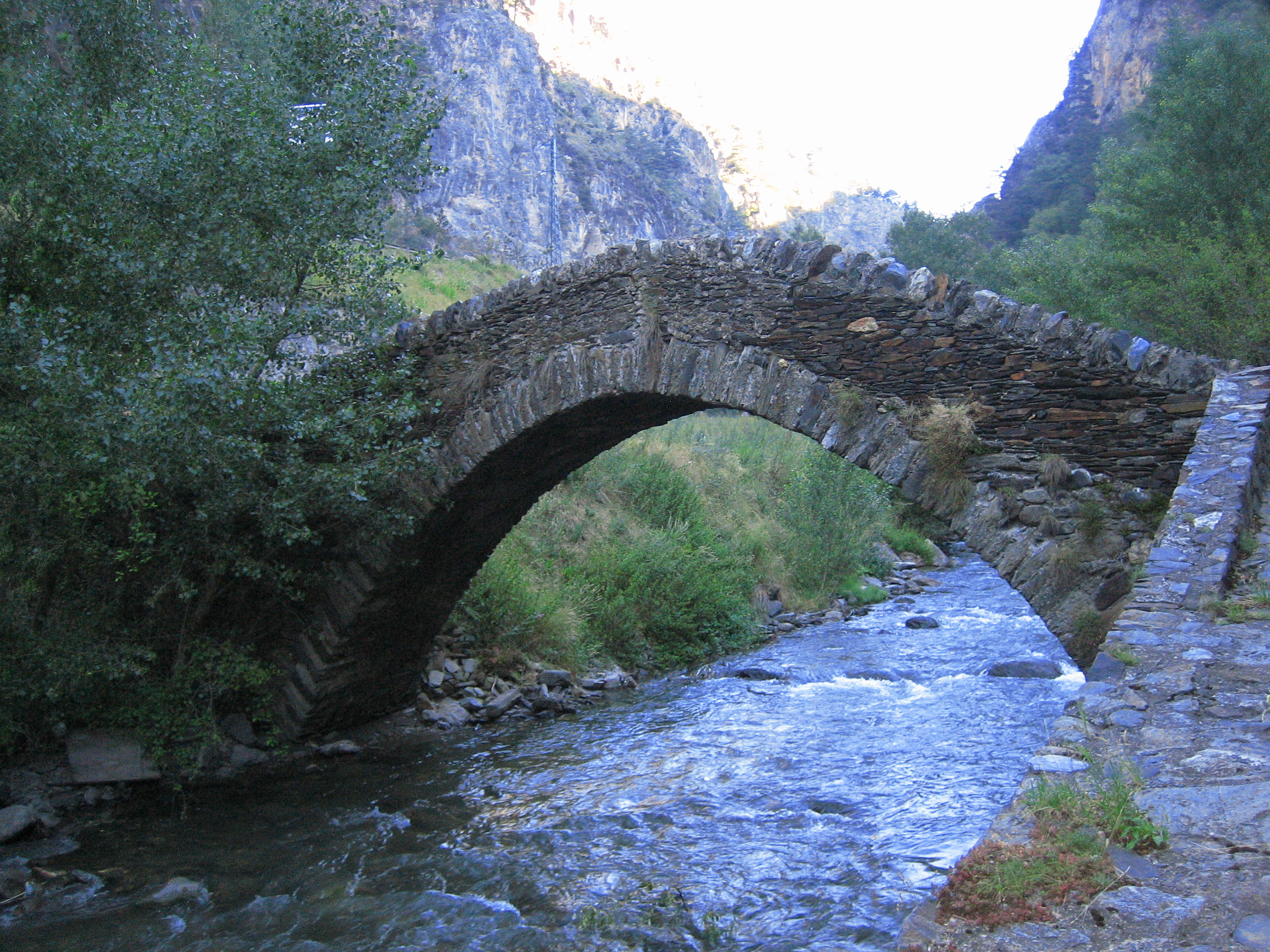
Pont de Sant Antoni bridge over the Valira del Nord river

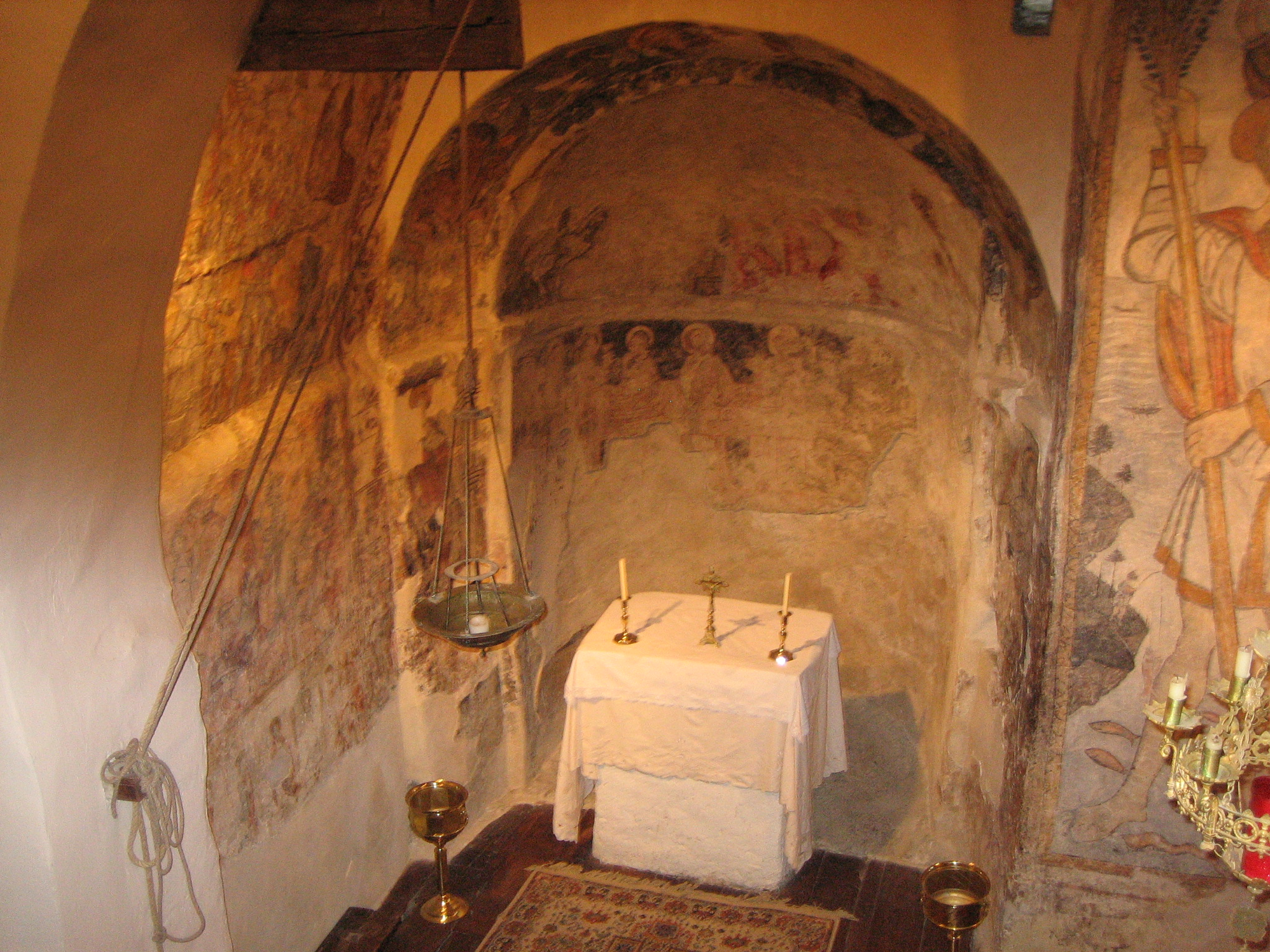
Church of St Christopher's interior from the rood screen

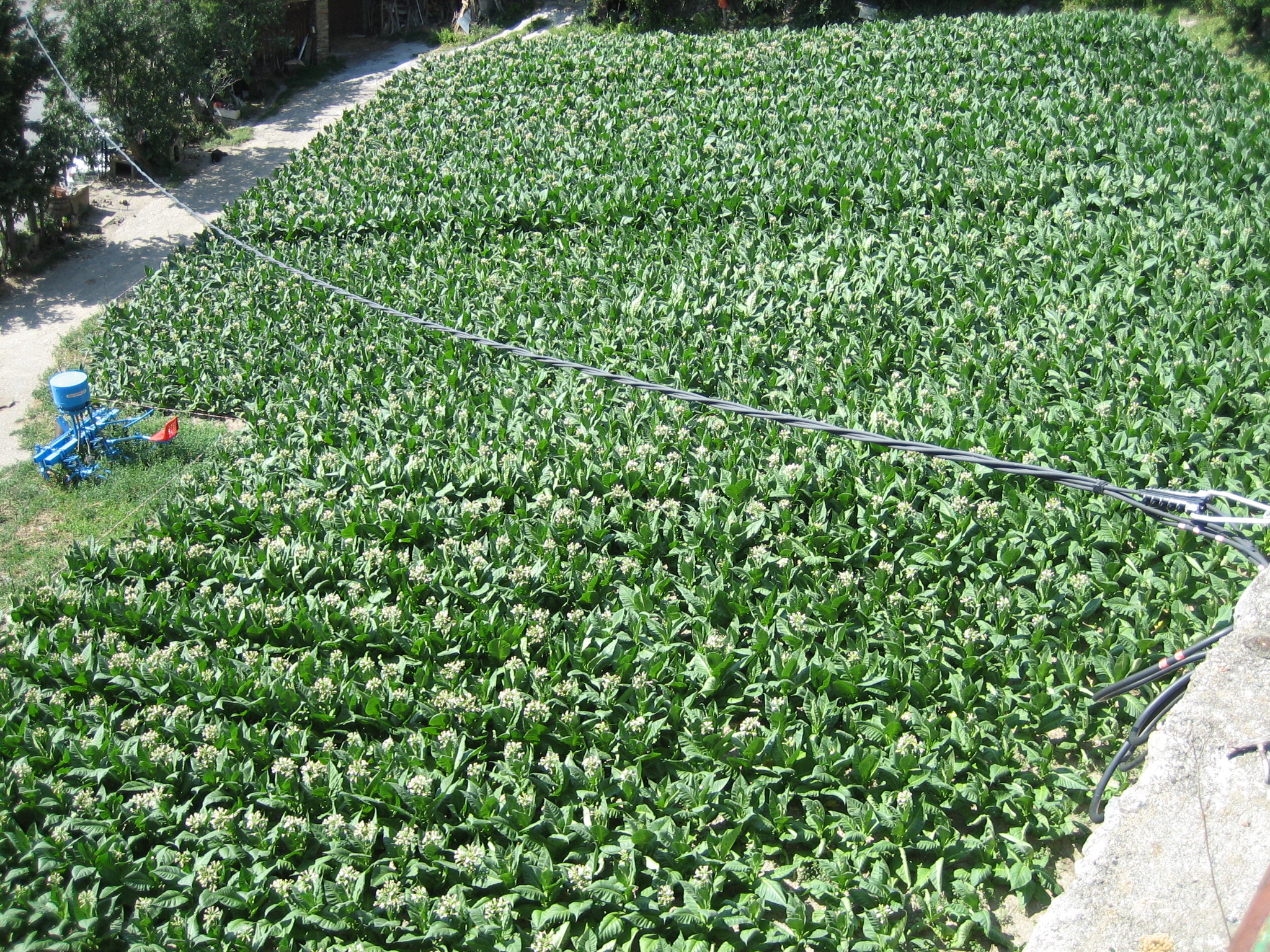
Tobacco field

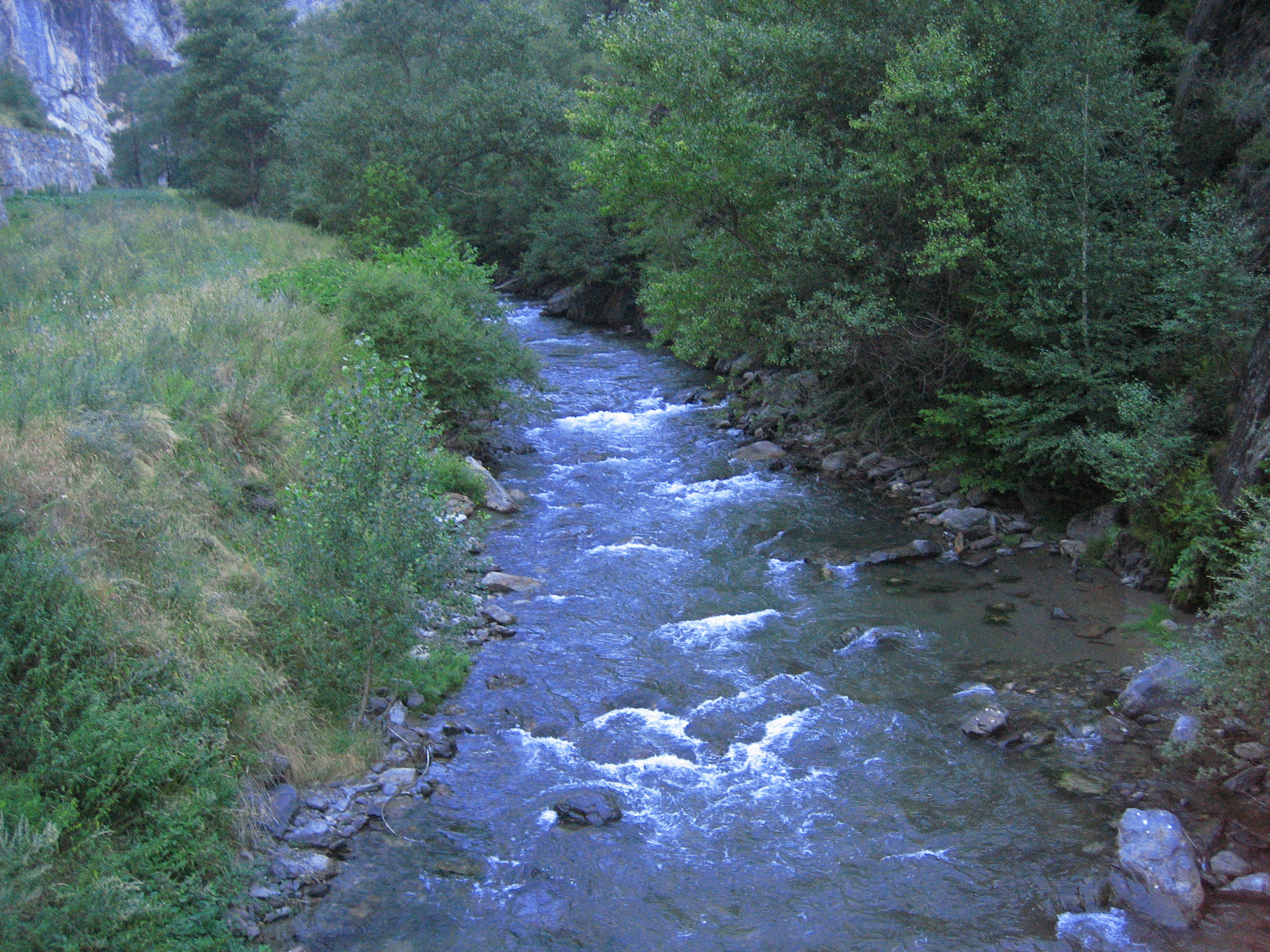
Valira del Nord, a Valira tributary, from Pont de Sant Antoni

== Works cited ==
=== Books ===
- Viusà i Galí, Joana (1998). The Best of Andorra. Edicions Á Campañà. ISBN 9788486294571.

=== News ===
- "Detinguda una resident per provocar un accident mortal a la carretera C-16". Radio and Television of Andorra. 2 March 2025. Archived from the original on 29 April 2025.
- "El Comú de la Massana proposa nous mecanismes legislatius per regular el creixement urbanístic". El Periòdic d'Andorra. 17 February 2025. Archived from the original on 29 April 2025.
- "El Tour, amb final a la capital". Bondia. 2 November 2020. Archived from the original on 29 April 2025.
- "L'habitatge a Escaldes arriba a preus màxims de 9.000 euros el m2". El Periòdic d'Andorra. Archived from the original on 29 April 2025.
- Lopez, Lydia (8 April 2021). "Adjudicat l'eixamplament de la CG-3 entre les Dos Valires i Anyós". El Periòdic d'Andorra. Archived from the original on 29 April 2025.
- Revuelta, Enric (10 February 2020). "Els pobles revifen amb l'augment de persones que hi van a viure". El Periòdic d'Andorra. Archived from the original on 29 April 2025.

=== Web ===
- "Anyós". Gran Enciclopèdia Catalana. Archived from the original on 29 April 2025.
- "Church of Saint Christopher of Anyós". Cultural Heritage of Andorra. Archived from the original on 2 May 2012.
- "Statistic and Data". Andorra.
