= Stéphanie Jiménez =

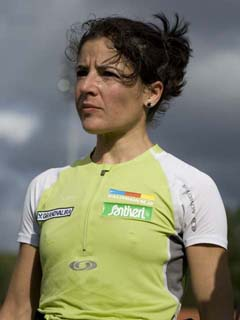
- Stéphanie Jiménez, photographed after finishing second in the 2008 Ben Nevis Race, part of the Buff Skyrunner World Series.

Personal information
- Nationality: Andorran now Italian
- Born: 17 December 1974 (age 51) Albi, France

Sport
- Country: Italy
- Sport: Mountain running Skyrunning
Medal record
Representing Andorra
Skyrunning
European Championships
Bronze medal – third place	2007 Poschiavo	SkyRace
Bronze medal – third place	2008 Zegama	SkyRace

Stéphanie Jiménez (born 17 December 1974) is a naturalized Italian, Andorran mountain runner and skyrunner.

== Biography ==
Jiménez was born in Albi, France. She has competed in the Buff Skyrunner World Series since 2006, finishing in the top five in the championship on every occasion. Her first race victory was in 2007, when she won the OSJ Ontake SkyRace at Mount Ontake, Japan.

She lives in Sterzing, South Tyrol, Italy.

== National titles ==
- Italian Vertical Kilometer Championships (FISKY version)
  - Vertical kilometer: 2014
