= Order of Charlemagne =

Order and civil decoration issued by Andorra

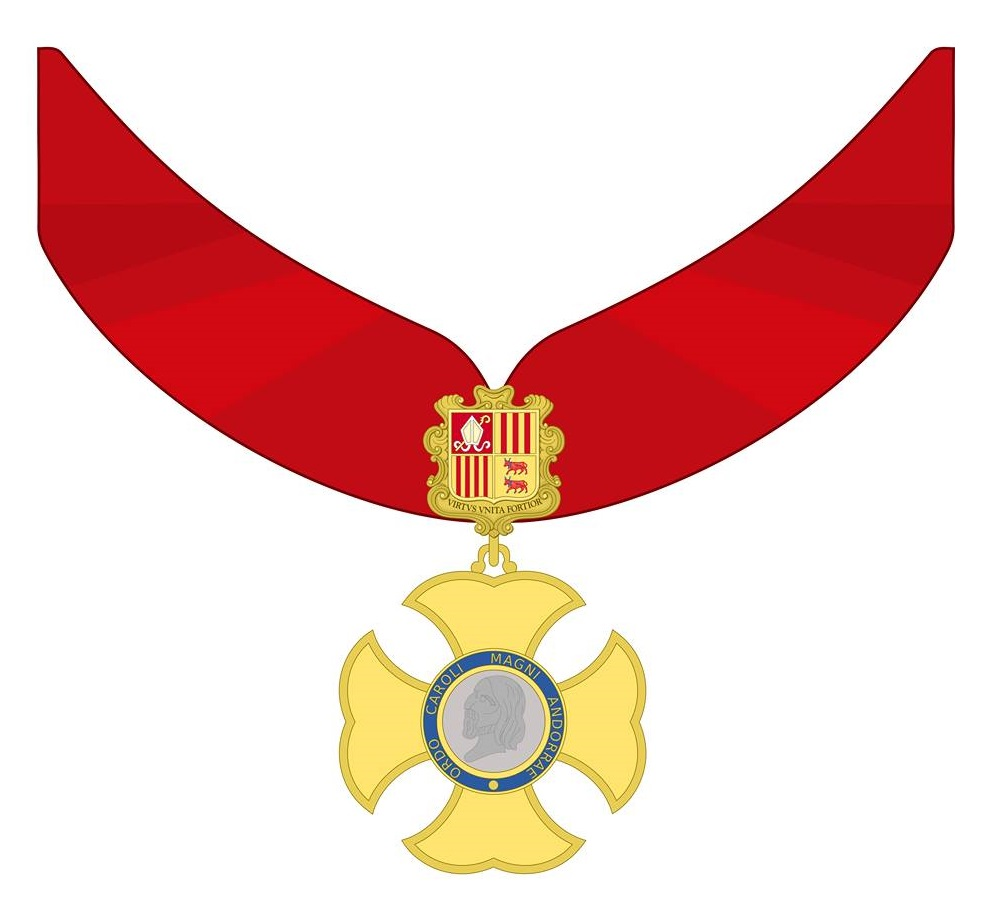
- Necklet of the first type of the Order of Charlemagne

Awarded by Head of Government of the Principality of Andorra
- Type: State order of merit
- Established: 7 December 2007
- Country: Andorra
- Motto: ORDO CAROLI MAGNI ANDORRAE
- Eligibility: "Reward the merits of those who have excelled in their field of work and who have made outstanding services to the Andorran State"
- Status: Active
- Founder: Juli Minoves Triquell
- President of the Council of the Order of Charlemagne: Xavier Espot Zamora
- Secretary General of the Council of the Order of Charlemagne: Imma Tor Faus
- Classes: Three
- Former grades: Collar, Medal

Statistics
- First induction: 2008

Precedence
- Next (higher): Cross of the Seven Arms
- Next (lower): None
- Ribbon of the Order of Charlemagne

The Order of Charlemagne (Catalan: Orde de Carlemany) is an order and civil decoration issued by the Principality of Andorra.

== History ==
The Order of Charlemagne was created 7 December 2007 by the Minister of Culture Juli Minoves Triquell with the purpose to "reward the merits of those who have excelled in their field of work and who have made outstanding services to the Andorran State".

The name of the order was given to honour the founder of the Principality of Andorra, Charlemagne, King of the Franks and first Holy Roman Emperor, who granted sovereignty to the people of the "Valleys of Andorra" in gratitude for helping him fight the Saracens. Since then, Charlemagne has been a national symbol of the principality.

The Order became dormant after the death of José Luis Sampedro in 2013, but was included in the Law 12/2022, of 12 May, of Protocol and Ceremonial as the second highest Order of the Principality of Andorra, just under the Cross of the Seven Arms.

The new regulation of the Order was approved by the Council of Ministers on 22 May 2024.

== Organisation ==
The President of the Council of the Order of Charlemagne of the order is the prime minister of the Principality of Andorra, currently Xavier Espot Zamora. The Secretary General of the Council of the Order of Charlemagne is the Minister of Foreign Affairs, currently Imma Tor Faus.

The Order of Charlemagne is currently divided in three classes, upon the reform accomplished during the 2022–2024 period:

- Grand Cross
- Commander
- Cross

Formerly, the 2007 version of the Order of Charlemagne was divided into four classes:

- Collar
- Grand Cross
- Commander
- Medal

== Recipients in selection ==
- José Luis Sampedro (2008) – Medal
- Xavier Espot Zamora (2019) – Grand Cross
- Carles Enseñat Reig (2023) – Grand Cross
- Imma Tor Faus (2023) – Grand Cross

Former recipients

- Frank Gehry (2008) – Grand Cross (he renounced it later)

== See also ==
- Charlemagne
