= Skyrunning European Championships =

European championship in skyrunning.

- Status: active
- Genre: sporting event
- Date: mid-year
- Frequency: biennial
- Location: various
- Inaugurated: 2009
- Most recent: 2017
- Organiser: ISF

The Skyrunning European Championships are biennial (annual only the first three editions) skyrunning competitions, held for the first time in 2009 and organised by International Skyrunning Federation.

== Editions ==
#	Year	SkyRace		Vertical Kilometer		Ultra SkyMarathon		Notes
#	Year	Venue	Date	Venue	Date	Venue	Date	Notes
1st	2007	(Switzerland) Poschiavo	10 June					
2nd	2008	(Spain) Zegama	25 May					
3rd	2009	(Italy) Canazei	17 July	(Italy) Alba di Canazei	19 July			
4th	2011	(Switzerland) Poschiavo	12 June	(Spain) Valencia	5 November			
5th	2013	(Italy) Canazei	21 July	(Italy) Canazei	19 July	(Italy) Vicenza	27 July	
6th	2015	(Spain) Zegama	17 May	(France) Chamonix	26 June	(France) Val d’Isère	12 July	
7th	2017	(Spain) Zeanuri	7 October	(Italy) Limone sul Garda	13 October	(France) Val d’Isère	8 July	
8th	2019	(Italy) Bognanco	7 September	(Italy) Bognanco	5 September	(France) Serina	1 September	

== Medals ==
=== Men's SkyRace ===
Year	Gold	Silver	Bronze
2007	(Italy) Marco De Gasperi	(Germany) Helmut Schiessl	(Italy) Dennis Brunod
2008	(Spain) Kilian Jornet	(Spain) Raúl García	(Germany) Helmut Schiessl
2009	(Spain) Raúl García	(Italy) Dennis Brunod	(Spain) Jessed Hernandez
2011	(Czech Republic) Robert Krupicka	(Spain) Luis Alberto Hernando	(Italy) Mikhail Mamleev
2013	(Spain) Kilian Jornet	(Italy) Marco De Gasperi	(Italy) Tadei Pivk
2015	(Italy) Tadei Pivk	(Spain) Manuel Merillas	(Spain) Pere Rulla
2017	(Spain) Aritz Egea	(Spain) Antonio Martinez	(Spain) Cristobal Adell
2019	(Spain) Jan Margarit	(Switzerland) Roberto Delorenzi	(Spain) Zaid Alt Malek

=== Women's SkyRace ===
Year	Gold	Silver	Bronze
2007	(Italy) Pierangela Baronchelli	(Portugal) Rosa Madureira	(Andorra) Stephanie Jimenez
2008	(France) Corinne Favre	(Italy) Pierangela Baronchelli	(Andorra) Stephanie Jimenez
2009	(Italy) Antonella Confortola	(Spain) Monica Ardid	(Italy) Giulia Miori
2011	(Spain) Oihana Kortazar	(Italy) Emanuela Brizio	(Spain) Nuria Domínguez
2013	(Sweden) Emelie Forsberg	(Spain) Silvia Serafin	(Spain) Nuria Dominguez
2015	(Spain) Azara Garcia	(Spain) Paula Cabrerzo	(Spain) Oihana Kortazar
2017	(Romania) Ingrid Mutter	(France) Cecilia Chiron	(Spain) Sheila Avilés
2019	(Romania) Denisa Dragomir	(Sweden) Fanny Borgström	(Spain) Ainhoa Sanz

=== Men's Vertical Kilometer ===
Year	Gold	Silver	Bronze
2009	(Italy) Urban Zemmer	(Spain) Agusti Roc	(Italy) Manfred Reichegger
2011	(Italy) Urban Zemmer	(Italy) Nicola Golinelli	(Italy) Marco De Gasperi
2013	(Spain) Kilian Jornet	(Italy) Urban Zemmer	(Italy) Philip Goetsch
2015	(France) François Gonon	(Norway) Stian Hovind-Angermund	(Norway) Thorbjørn Ludvigsen
2017	(Italy) Philip Goetsch	(Italy) Patrick Facchini	(Norway) Stian Agermund
2019	(Italy) Nadir Maguet	(Switzerland) Martin Anthamatten	(Spain) Jan Margarit

=== Women's Vertical Kilometer ===
Year	Gold	Silver	Bronze
2009	(Italy) Antonella Confortola	(United Kingdom) Angela Mudge	(Spain) Monica Ardid
2011	(Spain) Laura Orgué	(Spain) Oihana Kortazar	(France) Corinne Favre
2013	(Italy) Antonella Confortola	(Sweden) Emelie Forsberg	(Czech Republic) Iva Milesova
2015	(Spain) Paula Cabreiz	(Spain) Laura Orgué	(Spain) Maite Maiora
2017	(France) Christel Dewalle	(Germany) Michelle Maier	(Italy) Camilla Magliano
2019	(France) Christel Dewalle	(France) Jessica Pardin	(Switzerland) Victoria Kreuzer

=== Men's Ultra SkyMarathon ===
Year	Gold	Silver	Bronze
2013	(Spain) Luis Alberto Hernando (Spain) Kilian Jornet		(Hungary) Csaba Nemeth
2015	(Spain) Luis Alberto Hernando	(Spain) Manuel Merillas	(France) Clement Molliet
2017	(Spain) Luis Alberto Hernando	(France) Aurélien Dunand-Pallaz	(Russia) Dimitri Mityaev
2019	(Italy) Cristian Minoggio	(Spain) Manuel Merillas	(Italy) Daniel Jung

=== Women's Ultra SkyMarathon ===
Year	Gold	Silver	Bronze
2013	(Sweden) Emelie Forsberg	(Spain) Nuria Picas	(Spain) Uxue Fraile
2015	(Sweden) Emelie Forsberg	(Poland) Magdalena Laczac	(Czech Republic) Anna Strakova
2017	(Netherlands) Ragna Debats	(Sweden) Mimmi Kotka	(Czech Republic) Michaela Mertova
2019	(Spain) Ester Casajuana	(Spain) Sandra Sevillano	(Spain) Silvia Puigarnau

== See also ==
- Skyrunning World Championships
