= 2008 Skyrunning European Championships =

- Host city: Zegama
- Country: Spain
- Events: SkyRace
- Opening: May 25, 2008
- Closing: May 25, 2008
- Website: skyrunning.com

The 2008 Skyrunning European Championships was the 2nd edition of the global skyrunning competition, Skyrunning European Championships, organised by the International Skyrunning Federation and was held in Zegama (Spain), took place on 25 May 2008, coinciding with the Zegama-Aizkorri Maratoia.

== Results ==
The race of the VII Zegama-Aizkorri Maratoia (42.195 km) was the only competition with 391 athletes who reached the finish line of both sexes and nations (including non-European ones). obviously the medals of the European Championships were awarded by compiling single rankings, male and female, and not including non-European athletes.

=== Men's SkyRace ===
| Rank | Athlete | Country | Time |
|---|---|---|---|
| 1st place, gold medalist(s) | Kilian Jornet Burgada | Spain | 3:59:33 |
| 2nd place, silver medalist(s) | Raul Garcia Castan | Spain | 3:59:45 |
| 3rd place, bronze medalist(s) | Helmut Schiessl | Germany | 3:59:45 |
| 4 | Fulvio Dapit | Italy | 4:08:17 |
| 5 | Jose Felipe Larrazabal | Spain | 4:14:33 |

=== Women's SkyRace ===
| Rank | Athlete | Country | Time |
|---|---|---|---|
| 1st place, gold medalist(s) | Corinne Favre | France | 5:00:46 |
| 2nd place, silver medalist(s) | Pierangela Baronchelli | Italy | 5:12:04 |
| 3rd place, bronze medalist(s) | Stéphanie Jiménez | Andorra | 5:15:50 |
| 4 | Alizia Olazábal | Spain | 5:17:38 |
| 5 | Oihana Azkorbebeitia Urizar | Spain | 5:20:28 |
