= Sentiero 4 Luglio SkyMarathon =

Sentiero 4 Luglio SkyMarathon (SkyMarathon 4th July Footpath) is a skyrunning event created in 1994 at Santicolo di Corteno Golgi by Giacomo Salvadori. Its main claim is "a real stairway to the sky".

== History ==
Three times trial world championship (2003, 2004, 2007), for a few years (1999, 2011, 2012 and 2013) was organized in collaboration with Aprica (SO); from 2014 is again organized only by Corteno Golgi (BS). It consists of two distances: classical marathon and half marathon (this last, since 2000).

== Best male marathon racers ==
year	participant	country	total time (h:min:sec)
1994	Adriano Salvadori	Italy	4:27:59
1995	Fabio Meraldi	Italy	3:58:59
1996	Mauro Gatta	Italy	3:43:17
1997	Mauro Gatta	Italy	3:45:08
1998	Mauro Gatta	Italy	3:41:29
1999	Mauro Gatta	Italy	4:32:29
2000	Fabio Meraldi	Italy	4:22:43
2001	Bruno Brunod	Italy	4:11:39
2002	Dennis Brunod	Italy	4:17:02
2003	Mario Poletti	Italy	4:08:24
2004	Fabio Bonfanti	Italy	4:16:36
2005	Fabio Bonfanti	Italy	4:14:38
2006	Ettore Girardi	Italy	4:21:58
2007	Andrew Symonds	United Kingdom	4:15:11
2008	Paolo Gotti	Italy	4:25:06
2009	Jessed Hernandez	Spain	4:20:48
2010	not held		
2011	Titta Scalet	Italy	4:21:56
2012	Paolo Gotti and Tadei Pivk	Italy	4:40:20
2013	Tadei Pivk	Italy	4:10:17
2014	Tadei Pivk	Italy	4:14:46
2015	Tadei Pivk	Italy	4:21:19
2016	Tadei Pivk	Italy	4:15:09
2017	Marco De Gasperi	Italy	4:16:46
2018	Cristian Minoggio	Italy	4:13:55

== Best female marathon racers ==
year	participant	country	total time (h:min:sec)
1996	Gisella Bendotti	Italy	5:20:10
1997	Morena Paieri	Italy	5:19:04
1998	Morena Paieri	Italy	4:47:42
1999	Morena Paieri; Gloriana Pellissier	Italy	5:52:50
2000	Gloriana Pellissier	Italy	5:32:06
2001	Michela Benzoni	Italy	5:39:57
2002	Corinne Favre	France	5:24:30
2003	Corinne Favre	France	5:28:03
2004	Emanuela Brizio	Italy	5:29:44
2005	Emanuela Brizio	Italy	5:10:43
2006	Gloriana Pellissier	Italy	5:11:05
2007	Corinne Favre	France	5:18:21
2008	Corinne Favre; Pierangela Baronchelli	France; Italy	5:29:09
2009	Emanuela Brizio	Italy	5:12:37
2010	not held		
2011	Emanuela Brizio	Italy	5:14:59
2012	Emanuela Brizio	Italy	5:40:50
2013	Silvia Serafini	Italy	5:10:10
2014	Emanuela Brizio	Italy	5:25:00
2015	Emanuela Brizio	Italy	5:24:07
2016	Denisa Iolena Dragomir	Romania	5:27:13
2017	Denisa Iolena Dragomir	Romania	5:15:55
2018	Denisa Iolena Dragomir	Romania	5:14:03

== Bibliography ==
- Proloco Corteno Golgi - Sentiero 4 Luglio, quando l'amore si fa corsa (photobook, 2003)
- Proloco Corteno Golgi - Sortilegi di Vallecamonica, arte cultura natura sport turismo sul versante soleggiato delle Alpi Centrali (yearly magazine, since 1999)
- Giacomo Salvadori (Liberedizioni) - Lassù, tra sogno e realtà - Genesi e realizzazione del Sentiero 4 Luglio, del Bivacco Davide e della Maratona del Cielo (photobook, 2017)
