= Roser Suñé Pascuet =

Andorran politician

The Most Excellent Roser Suñé MP
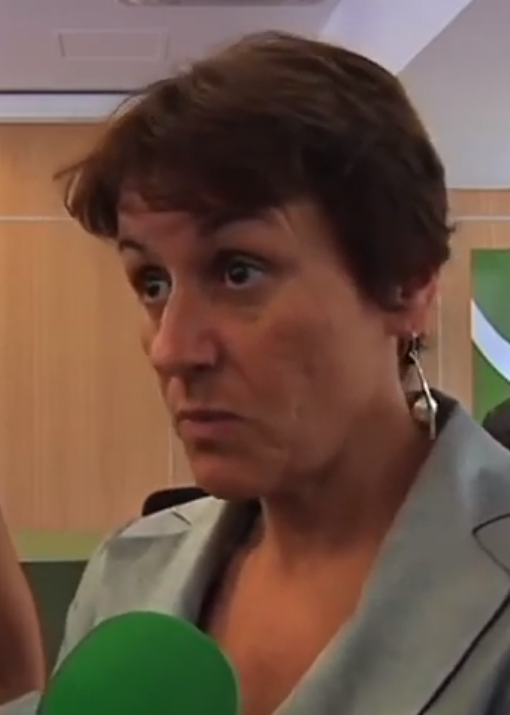

General Syndic of the General Council of Andorra
- In office 2 May 2019 – 26 April 2023
- Monarchs: Episcopal Co-prince: Joan Enric Vives Sicília; French Co-prince: Emmanuel Macron
- Representative: Episcopal: Josep Maria Mauri; French: Patrick Strzoda
- Preceded by: Vicenç Mateu Zamora
- Succeeded by: Carles Enseñat Reig

Personal details
- Born: August 26, 1960 (age 65) Andorra la Vella, Andorra
- Party: Democrats for Andorra
- Education: University of Barcelona

Roser Suñé Pascuet (born 26 August 1960) is an Andorran politician who served as General Syndic of the General Council from 2019 to 2023, as a member of the Democrats for Andorra. Prior to her tenure in the General Council she was a diplomat for Andorra.

== Early life ==
Roser Suñé Pascuet was born in Andorra la Vella, on 26 August 1960, to a father from Vall Fosca and a mother from Civís. She graduated from Escola Blanquerna with a teaching degree in 1980, and from the University of Barcelona with a degree in Catalan Philology in 1983.

== Career ==
Working as a teacher in the 1980s and 1990s, Suñé was Director of Vocational Training for the Andorran Ministry of Education from 1994 to 1998, and Director of the Training Centre for Apprentices within the ministry from 1997 to 1998. She was Director of Foreign Policy, Bilateral Affairs and the European Union in the Ministry of Foreign Affairs from 2002 to 2005.

Andorra was represented at the United Nations by Suñé as minister plenipotentiary from 1998 to 2002. She was Andorra's ambassador to Sweden from 1999 to 2005, Norway from 2000 to 2005, and Iceland from 2000 to 2005. She was the Minister of Education and Youth from 2011 to 2015.

Democrats for Andorra placed Suñé as second on their party list for the 2019 election. On 2 May 2019, Suñé was elected General Syndic of the General Council with 17 votes coming from the Democrats for Andorra, Committed Citizens, and Liberals of Andorra. Her opponent, Rosa Gili of the Social Democratic Party, received 7 votes. She was the first woman to hold the position. Suñé declined to run in the 2023 election.

== Works cited ==
=== News ===
- "Roser Suñé, primera síndica del Consell General d'Andorra". Ràdio Seu. 3 May 2019. Archived from the original on 23 April 2025.
- Dawn, Doral (12 May 2019). "Roser Suñé, tarannà conciliador". Diari d'Andorra. Archived from the original on 23 April 2025.
- Esteban, Adrian (3 May 2019). "Roser Suñé esdevé la primera dona síndica general d'Andorra". El Periòdic d'Andorra. Archived from the original on 23 April 2025.
- Galindo, Fernando (26 February 2019). "Roser Suñé serà la número dos de DA a la llista nacional". Diari d'Andorra. Archived from the original on 23 April 2025.
- Raventós, Lydia (16 May 2022). "Roser Suñé descarta tornar a concórrer a les eleccions". Diari d'Andorra. Archived from the original on 23 April 2025.

=== Web ===
- "Roser Suñé Pascuet". General Council. Archived from the original on 21 November 2019.
