= Raúl García Castán =

Spanish sky runner

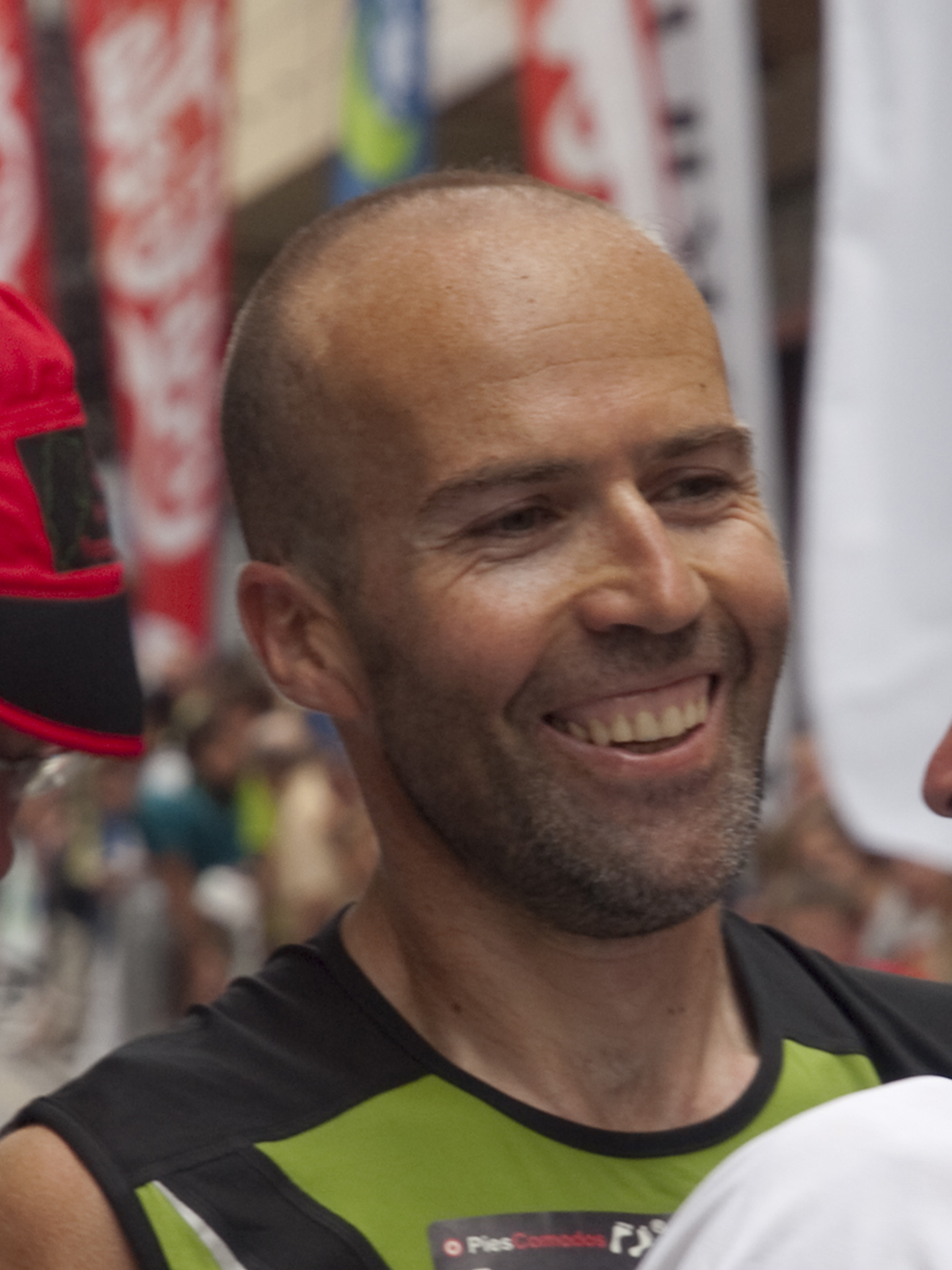
- Raúl García Castán in 2010

Personal information
- Nationality: Spanish
- Born: 8 October 1970 (age 55) Segovia
- Height: 1.70 m (5 ft 7 in)
- Weight: 56 kg (123 lb)

Sport
- Country: Spain
- Sport: Skyrunning
Medal record
European Championships
Gold medal – first place	2009 Canazei	SkyRace
Silver medal – second place	2008 Zegama	SkyRace

Raúl García Castán (born 8 October 1970) is a Spanish male sky runner, European champion (2009) and vice-European champion (2008) in the SkyRace, second in the 2007 World Cup.
