= Oihana Kortazar =

Spanish sky runner

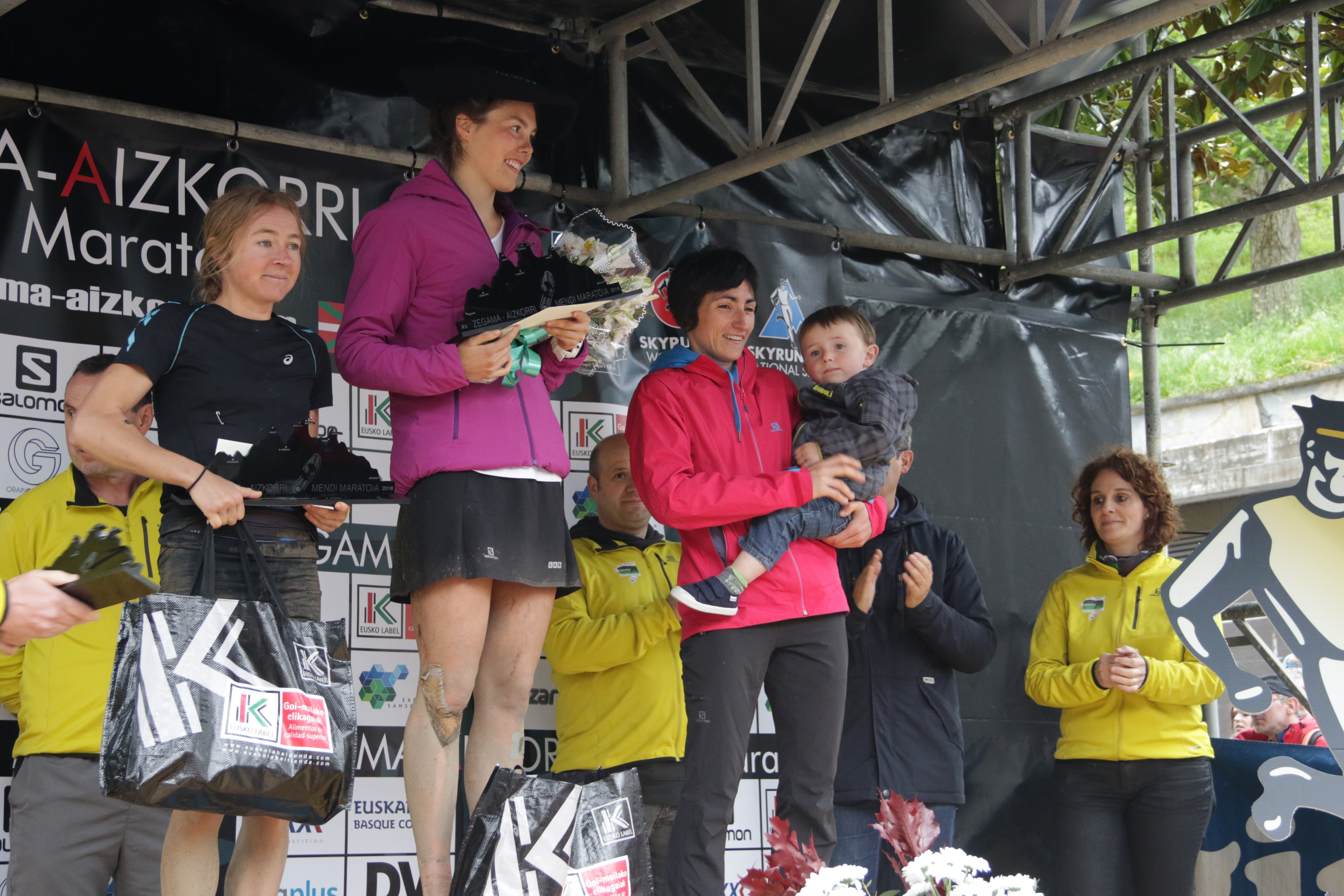
- Oihana Kortazar on podium of the 2016 Zegama-Aizkorri (third from left with the baby).

Personal information
- Full name: Oihana Kortazar Aranzeta
- Nationality: Spanish
- Born: 29 June 1984 (age 41) Elgeta

Sport
- Country: Spain
- Sport: Skyrunning
Medal record
Skyrunning
European Championships
Gold medal – first place	2011 Poschiavo	SkyRace
Silver medal – second place	2011 Valencia	Vertical Kilometer
Bronze medal – third place	2015 Zegama	SkyRaxe

Oihana Kortazar Elizondo (born 29 June 1984) is a Spanish female sky runner who won gold medal at the 2011 Skyrunning European Championships in SkyRace and the overall title of the 2011 Skyrunner World Series.
