= Aires Sousa =

Portuguese footballer

Personal information
- Full name: Aires Rodrigo da Encarnação Sousa
- Date of birth: 17 September 1998 (age 28)
- Place of birth: Funchal, Portugal
- Height: 1.73 m (5 ft 8 in)
- Position: Winger

Team information
- Current team: Dalvík/Reynir

Youth career
- 2007–2016: Nacional
- 2016–2017: Benfica
- 2017: → Belenenses (loan)

Senior career*
Years	Team	Apps	(Gls)
2017–2018	Benfica	0	(0)
2017	→ Sporting Covilhã (loan)	1	(0)
2018	→ Armacenenses (loan)	4	(0)
2018–2019	Cova da Piedade B	29	(6)
2019–2022	Marítimo B	22	(2)
2022–2023	Bylis	8	(1)
2023	Džiugas	21	(3)
2024	Babrungas	15	(6)
2024	Banga Gargždai	12	(3)
2025	Igman Konjic	11	(0)
2025–2026	Machico	21	(0)
2026–	Dalvík/Reynir	19	(6)
- * Club domestic league appearances and goals as of 14 October 2026

Aires Rodrigo da Encarnação Sousa (born 17 September 1998) is a Portuguese professional footballer who plays as a forward for Icelandic club Dalvík/Reynir.

== Career ==
Born in Funchal, Sousa made his professional debut with Sporting da Covilhã in a 2017–18 LigaPro match against União da Madeira on 10 December 2017.

On 18 January 2025 announced about new player in FK Igman Konjic (Bosnia).
