= Ricard de Haro Jiménez =

Andorran politician (born 1966)

Ricard de Haro Jiménez (born 15 February 1966) is an Andorran politician. He is a member of the Renovació Democràtica.
