= Khaled Aly el-Bakly =

Egyptian diplomat

Khaled Aly El-Bakly is an Egyptian career diplomat who served as ambassador of Arab Republic of Egypt to Belgium and head of mission of Egypt to the European Council and Commission.

== Career ==
El-Bakly's diplomatic career started in 1996, when he served as Egypt's Deputy Assistant Minister of Foreign Affairs. His first ambassadorial post was to India. In 2018, he was appointed ambassador extraordinary and plenipotentiary of the Arab Republic of Egypt to Luxembourg and later reposted with concurrent accreditations as Egyptian ambassador to Belgium and head of mission to the European Council and Commission in 2021.
