= Vicenç Mateu Zamora =

Andorran diplomat and politician

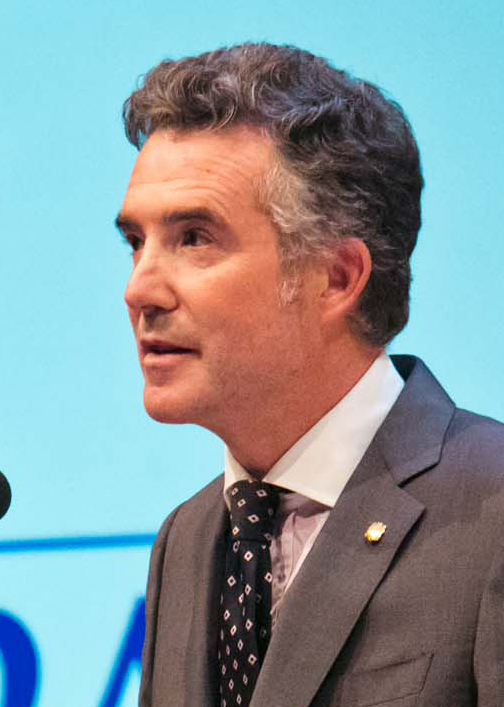

General Syndic of Andorran Parliament
- In office 1 April 2011 – 2 May 2019
- Monarchs: Episcopal Co-prince: Joan Enric Vives Sicília; French Co-prince: François Hollande; Emmanuel Macron
- Representative: Episcopal: Josep Maria Mauri; French: Thierry Lataste
- Preceded by: Josep Dallerès Codina
- Succeeded by: Roser Suñé Pascuet

Personal details
- Born: 3 December 1961 (age 64) Les Escaldes, Andorra
- Party: Democratic National Initiative; New Centre; Democrats for Andorra
- Education: University of Barcelona; Polytechnic University of Catalonia; Complutense University of Madrid

Vicenç Mateu Zamora (born 3 December 1961) is an Andorran diplomat and politician who served as General Syndic of the General Council from 2011 to 2019. He has served as Andorra's ambassador to multiple European countries and UNESCO.

== Early life ==
Vicenç Mateu Zamora was born in Les Escaldes, Andorra, on 3 December 1961. He graduated from the University of Barcelona with a Philosophy and Educational Sciences degree in 1984, the Polytechnic University of Catalonia with a Master of Business Administration in 2001, and the Complutense University of Madrid with a Doctor of Philosophy in 2006.

== Career ==
Zamora was a professor at the Sant Ermengol School from 1984 to 1989, and 1991 to 1999. He was a professor at the National University of Distance Education from 1993 to 1999. From 1990 to 1991, Zamora was the general secretary for the Ministry of Education, Culture and Youth of Andorra. He was Andorra's ambassador to Spain from 2001 to 2007, Morocco from 2002 to 2007, and Croatia and Cyprus in 2007. From 2007 to 2009, he was Andorra's ambassador to France, Italy, Greece, and UNESCO. In 2024, he became Andorra's ambassador to Belgium.

A founding member of the Democratic National Initiative, Zamora was placed as the first person for its party list. He was elected to the General Council in the 1993 and 1997 elections. He was a founding member of New Centre. After the 2011 election he returned to the General Council as a member of the Democrats for Andorra.

During Zamora's tenure in the General Council he served on committees for Financial and Budgetary Affairs from 1993 to 2000, Education, Culture Youth and Sports from 1993 to 1998, Health and Environment from 1999 to 2000, and Foreign Policy from 1993 to 2000. He was president of the Foreign Policy committee from 1999 to 2000.

== Works cited ==
=== Book ===
- 6th Conference (PDF). Parliament of Malta.

=== Web ===
- "Lettres de créance". Monarchy of Belgium. 23 October 2024. Archived from the original on 25 April 2025.
- "Mr. Vicenç Mateu Zamora". General Council. Archived from the original on 14 February 2013.
