= Maria Reig Moles =

Andorran entrepreneur (born 1951)

Maria Reig i Moles
- Born: 17 May 1951 (age 74); Andorra
- Occupations: entrepreneur, banker, politician
- Children: Carles Ensenyat Reig (son)
- Parent(s): Serafí Maria Reig Ribó and Moles Easter Maria Reig

Maria Reig i Moles (born 17 May 1951) is an Andorran entrepreneur. She is president of the Reig Capital Group, a family enterprise which she inherited on her father's death. She was the only woman to be involved in drafting the 1993 Constitution of Andorra, and has held various government roles in Andorra. She founded a philanthropic group, Barcelona Global, and is patron of a number of organisations, including the Barcelona Museum of Contemporary Art. Her son was elected General Syndic of the General Council of Andorra.

== Life ==
Reig was born in Andorra on 17 May 1951, the only child of Serafí Maria Reig Ribó and Moles Easter Maria Reig. She is a member of a family who are important in the Andorran banking and tobacco industries. She studied Law and Fine Arts in Barcelona. When her father died, she became president of the Reig Capital Group at the age of 28. She was the only woman involved in drafting the Constitution of Andorra that was approved in 1993, and has held several government roles. She was president of the Reig Capital Group and a director of the bank Crèdit Andorrà, and Fills de Julià Reig. She is founder of Barcelona Global, which aims to involve organisations and individuals in "transformative patronage", and has been Consul general. Moles's son Carles Enseñat Reig was elected General Syndic of the General Council of Andorra in 2023. Since stepping down from the Crèdit Andorrà board in 2018, Reig has taken a less active role in public affairs.

Reig is patron of the Barcelona Museum of Contemporary Art, and the Association of Art and Patronage. In 2014 she was awarded a philanthropy award.
