= Pierangela Baronchelli =

Italian sky runner

Personal information
- Nickname: Angela
- Nationality: Italian
- Born: 8 November 1972 (age 53) Villa d'Ogna

Sport
- Country: Italy
- Sport: Athletics; Skyrunning
- Event: 3000 m steeplechase

Achievements and titles
- Personal best: 3000 m s'chase: 10:13.33 (2002)
Medal record
European Championships
Gold medal – first place	2007 Poschiavo	SkyRace
Silver medal – second place	2008 Zegama	SkyRace

Pierangela Baronchelli (born 8 November 1972) is an Italian female sky runner (former steeplechase runner), European champion (2007) and vice-European champion (2008) in the SkyRace.

== Biography ==
Before practicing skyrunning, Baronchelli had practiced athletics, in 2001, in the 3000 metres steeplechase, she became the first female Italian champion of this new specialty.

== Achievements ==
Year	Competition	Venue	Position	Event	Time	Notes
2007	European Championships	(Switzerland) Poschiavo	1st	SkyRace (31 km)	3:21:07	
2008	European Championships	(Spain) Zegama	2nd	SkyRace (42.195 km)	5:12:04	

== National titles ==
- Italian Mountain Running Championships
  - Mountain running: 2000
