= Amandin Rugira =

Rwandan politician

Amandin Rugira is a Rwandan politician and diplomat who serves as the Rwandan ambassador to Zambia and Malawi. He also served as Rwandan ambassador to the Democratic Republic of the Congo, to Belgium and to the European Union.

== Career ==
Rugira was a member of the Republican Democratic Movement until 2002 when the party was dissolved. He joined the Rwandan Patriotic Front (RPF) party and sits on the Foreign Affairs Committee of the party. Rugira served as a director in various offices including in the office of the Prime Minister, Ministry of Trade and Industry, the Central Bank and at the Rwandan Development Bank. He was promoted to the rank of permanent secretary and deployed to the Ministry of Foreign Affairs before being appointed Rwandan ambassador to the Democratic Republic of the Congo. He was redeployed from Congo to European Union and Belgium as an envoy.
