= Esther Rabasa Grau =

Andorran diplomat

Permanent Representative of Andorra to the European Union
- Incumbent
- Assumed office June 2019

Permanent Representative of Andorra to the Council of Europe
- In office June 2015 – September 2019

Permanent Representative of Andorra to the Organisation for the Prohibition of Chemical Weapons
- Incumbent
- Assumed office April 2018

Ambassador of Andorra to the BeNeLux countries
- Incumbent
- Assumed office June 2019

Esther Rabasa Grau is the ambassador of Andorra to the BeNeLux countries Belgium, the Netherlands and Luxembourg. She is also Permanent Representative to the European Union, Council of Europe (until 2019) as well as to the Organisation for the Prohibition of Chemical Weapons.
