= Bernadeta Gaspà Bringueret =

Andorran politician (born 1965)

Bernadeta Gaspà Bringueret (born July 23, 1965) is an Andorran politician. She is a member of the Liberal Party of Andorra.

== Biography ==
She is a member of the Liberal Party of Andorra.

She was Deputy General Syndic (Vice-President of the Andorran Parliament) from 2005 to 2009.

She was not re-elected as a general councillor onApril 26, 2009.
