= Joan Gabriel i Estany =

Andorran politician

Joan Gabriel i Estany (born 28 November 1963) is an Andorran politician. He is a member of the Liberal Party of Andorra and served as Síndic general (presiding officer) of the Parliament of Andorra from 2005 to 2009. He was the candidate for the Reformist Coalition during the 2009 election.
