= Francesc Areny Casal =

Andorran politician

Francesc Areny Casal is an Andorran politician. He was General Syndic (President) of the General Council of Andorra between 1997 and 2005.
