= Julià Reig Ribó =

Andorran politician

Julià Reig Ribó (5 December 1911 – 2 January 1996) was the general councillor for the Valles de Andorra from 1948 to 1949 and general syndic from 1960 to 1966 and from 1972 to 1978. During this period as the leader in Andorran politics, he undertook a series of measures to modernise the structure of the country, founded the Andorran Social Security Office (1966) and opened up Andorra to the outside world. He died on 2 January 1996 at the age of 84.
