= Jordi Farràs Forné =

Andorran politician

Jordi Farràs Forné is an Andorran politician. He served in the General Parliament of Andorra as President between 1992 and 1994. Forné is a member of the Democratic Party.
