= Diari d'Andorra =

Andorran newspaper

- Front page on 24 February 2018 (English: "An overtaking caused a fatal motorcycle accident")
- Type: Daily newspaper
- Founded: 20 May 1991; 34 years ago
- Headquarters: Andorra la Vella
- Website: www.diariandorra.ad

Diari d'Andorra (Catalan pronunciation: [diˈaɾi ðənˈdorə]) is a newspaper of the Principality of Andorra. The paper is published in Catalan. It is headquartered in Andorra la Vella and has been published by Premsa Andorrana SA since 1991. Its daily distribution is 19,000 copies with 30,000 in the weekend edition 7dies distributed in homes and businesses.
