= El Periòdic d'Andorra =

El Periòdic d'Andorra (Catalan pronunciation: [əl pəɾiˈɔðiɡ dənˈdorə]) is a newspaper of the Principality of Andorra. It has its headquarters in Escaldes-Engordany.
