= Elida =

Elida may refer to:

- Elida (given name)

== Places ==
- Elida, New Mexico, a town in Roosevelt County, New Mexico, United States
- Elida, Ohio, a village in Allen County, Ohio, United States
- Elida, Illinois, unincorporated community in Winnebago County, Illinois, United States

== Other ==
- Elida High School, a high school in Elida, Ohio, United States
- Hurricane Elida (disambiguation), several tropical cyclones in the Eastern Pacific Ocean
- Elida (ship), Christian performance mega yacht, mission ship in Sweden
