= Manuel Mas Ribó =

Andorran diplomat

Member of the General Council (Andorra)
- In office 1994–1995

Minister of External Affairs Andorra
- In office 1995–1997
- Preceded by: Marc Vila Amigó
- Succeeded by: Albert Pintat

Ambassador of Andorra to the Holy See
- In office May 29, 1998 – July 30, 2001
- Succeeded by: Géraldine Sasplugas

Ambassador of Andorra to Ireland
- In office July 14, 1999 – July 30, 2001
- Preceded by: Juli Minoves
- Succeeded by: Albert Pintat

Personal details
- Born: February 26, 1946 Barcelona
- Died: July 30, 2001 (aged 55) Andorra la Vella
- Spouse: Anna Santuré
- Education: law
- Alma mater: University of Barcelona

Manuel Mas Ribo (February 26, 1946 – July 30, 2001) was the foreign minister of Andorra from 1994 to 1997.

Ribo was born in Barcelona and moved to Andorra. He graduated from the University of Barcelona becoming a lawyer and political writer.

He was involved in the publication Tele/Estel.

Ribo was General Counsel and Secretary General of the General Council of Andorra, then served as member from 1994 to 1995 before entering cabinet. After politics he became a diplomat in the Holy See 1998 to 2001 and Ireland from 1999 to 2001. Ribo remained a diplomat when he died in Andorra.
