= List of ambassadors of Andorra to France =

Coordinates: 48.85667°N 2.274528°E

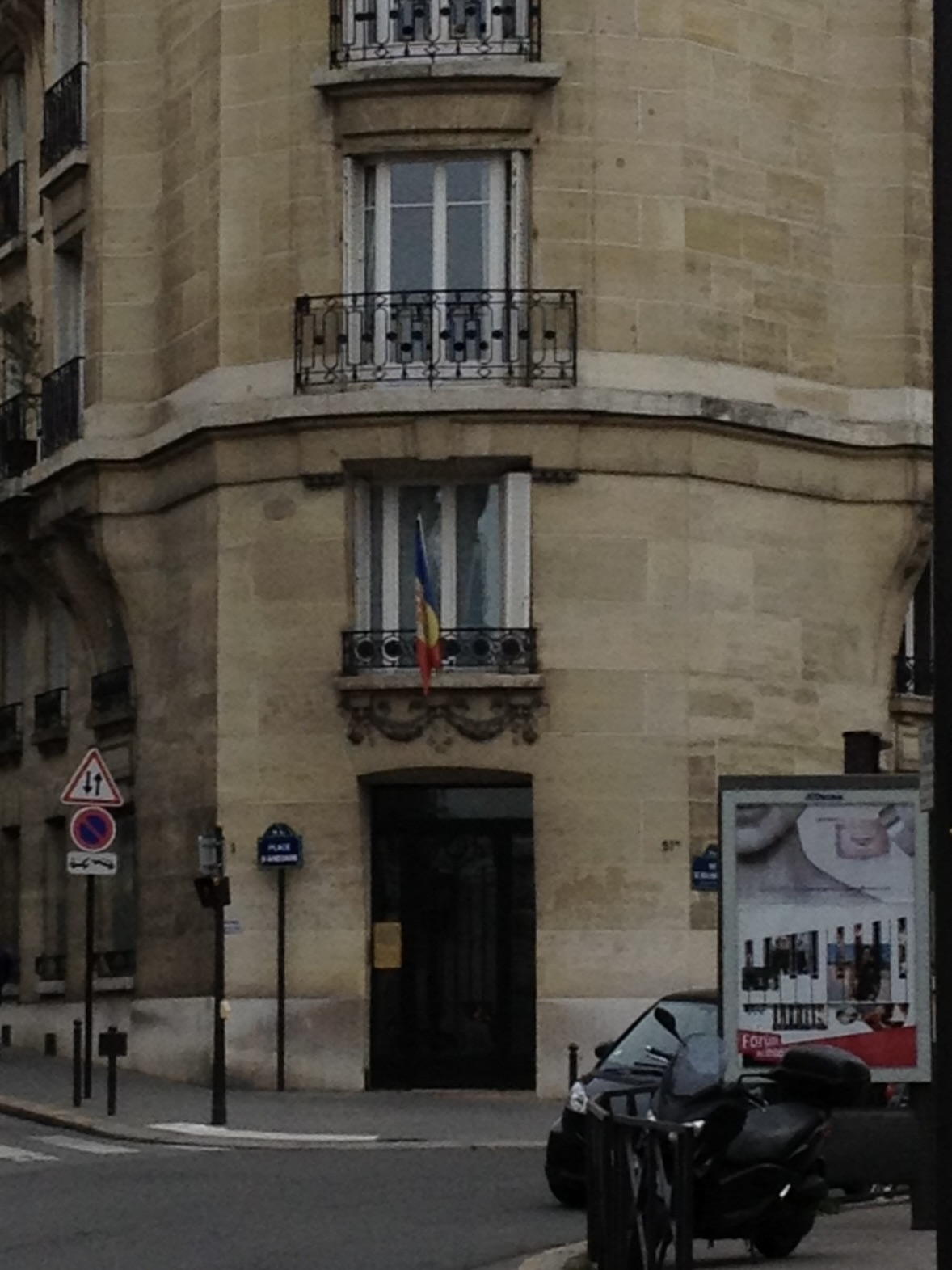
The Andorran Ambassador to France has his residence in Paris and is Permanent Representative to the UNESCO and Organisation internationale de la Francophonie.

The Andorran ambassador to France is the official diplomatic officer of Andorra to France, and has been occupied by the following persons:

== List of heads of mission ==
designated	BOPA	accredited	JORF	ambassador	Observation	List of heads of government of Andorra	President of France	Term end
1994	(Note: Decret de 16-1-95 pel qual es revoca el nomenament del Sr. Xavier Espot Miró com a Ambaixador del Principat d'Andorra a la República Francesa. Any 7 / núm. 5 / p. 100)			Xavier Espot Miró		Òscar Ribas Reig	François Mitterrand	January 16, 1995
April 6, 1995	(Note: Decret de 6-4-95, BOPA n°20 du 7 avril 1995, p.428.)	May 4, 1995	(Note: Remise de lettres de créance, JORF n°107 du 6 mai 1995, p.7158, Système NOR MAEP9550013G.)	Meritxell Mateu i Pi		Marc Forné Molné	Jacques Chirac	
July 14, 1999	(Note: Decret de 14-7-99, BOPA n°42 du 21 juillet 1999, p.1613.)	November 2, 1999	(Note: Remise de lettres de créance, JORF n°258 du 6 novembre 1999, p.16598, Système NOR MAEP9950107G)	Imma Tor Faus		Marc Forné Molné	Jacques Chirac	
July 25, 2007	(Note: Decret del 25-7-2007, BOPA n°62 du 1er août 2007, p.3942–3943.)	November 19, 2007	(Note: Remise de lettres de créance, JORF n°271 du 22 novembre 2007, p.19065, texte n°1, Système NOR MAEX0711027G.)	Vicenç Mateu Zamora		Albert Pintat	Nicolas Sarkozy	
October 7, 2009	(Note: Decret del 07-10-2009, BOPA n°72 du 7 octobre 2009, p.3734.)	January 15, 2010	(Note: Remise de lettres de créance, JORF n°15 du 19 janvier 2010, p.1042, texte n°1, Système NOR MAEP1050004E.)	Julià Vila Coma	May 3, 2004: Permanent Representative of Andorra to the United Nations, Julià Vila Coma, presented his credentials today to Secretary-General	Jaume Bartumeu	Nicolas Sarkozy	
September 14, 2011	(Note: Decret del 14-09-2011, BOPA n°57 du 21 septembre 2011, p.3378.)	July 11, 2012	(Note: Remise de lettres de créance, JORF n°208 du 18 juillet 2012, p.11778, texte n°1, Système NOR MAEP1150061E.)	Maria Ubach i Font		Antoni Martí	Nicolas Sarkozy	
2015		July 6, 2015	(Note: Remise de lettres de créance, JORF n°158 du 10 juillet 2015, p.11770, texte n°1, Système NOR MAEP1514199X.)	Cristina Rodriguez Galán		Antoni Martí	François Hollande	
