= Jaume Serra Serra =

Andorran politician (born 1959)

Member of the General Council (Andorra)
- In office 2005–2006

Ambassador of Andorra to Holy See
- Incumbent
- Assumed office 15 December 2011
- Preceded by: Miquel Àngel Canturri Montanya

Ambassador of Andorra to Portugal
- Incumbent
- Assumed office 17 June 2015
- Preceded by: Maria Ubach i Font

Personal details
- Born: 11 June 1959 (age 67) Andorra
- Spouse: He is married
- Children: has three children.
- Education: In 1984 Graduated in Economics from the University of Barcelona.), In 2001 he attended a master's degree in Administration and Commerce from the Polytechnic University of Catalonia.; In 2006 he attended a Diploma in Optometry from the Polytechnic University of Catalonia.

Jaume Serra Serra (born 11 June 1959) is an Andorran politician. He is a member of the Liberal Party of Andorra.

- From 1987 to 2011 he held among others positions, President of Forces Elèctriques d'Andorra that runs Escaldes Hydroelectric Power Station.
- He was Member of the Institute of National Board of Finance.
- He was Chief executive officer of ENGAS. (Enagas SA is a Spain-based company active in the energy sector. The Company is engaged in the transport and underground storage of natural gas.)
- He was President of Quars Andorra.
- From 1993 to 1994 he was Coordinator of the Strategic Plan of the Government of Andorra.
- In 1994 he was Minister of Economy.
- From 2004 to 2005 he was Coordinator of the Strategic Plan of the University of Andorra.
- From 2005 to 2009 he was Member of the General Council (Andorra) and President of the Commission on Finance, Vice-President of the Commission for Foreign Affairs of the General Council and Vice-President of the Liberal Parliamentary Group.
- From 2008 to 2009 he was Member of the Andorran Delegation to the Organization for Security and Co-operation in Europe.
- From 2009 to 2011 he was Member the General Council (Andorra) and member of the Finance Committee and the delegation to the Inter-Parliamentary Union.
- Since 15 December 2011 he is ambassador of the Principality of Andorra to the Holy See.
- Since 17 June 2015 he is ambassador in Lisbon.
- Since 21 February 2020 he is Permanent Representative of Andorra to the United Nations (Vienna).
