= Permanent Representative of Andorra to the United Nations Office at Vienna =

Coordinates: 48.202161°N 16.369854°E

The Andorran Permanent representative to the United Nations Office at Vienna has his residence in Andorra La Vella and is also accredited as Ambassador to the governments in Vienna (Austria), San Marino, Prague (Czech Republic), Bratislava (Slovakia), Bucharest (Romania) Budapest (Hungary) and is head of delegation of the Principality of Andorra next to the Organization for Security and Co-operation in Europe and representative of Andorra to the Preparatory Commission of the Comprehensive Nuclear-Test-Ban Treaty Organization.

== List of heads of mission ==
Designated	Accredited	Ambassador	Observation	List of heads of government of Andorra	Chancellor of Austria	Term end
July 14, 1999	October 1, 1999	Joan Pujal Laborda	with residence in Vienna	Marc Forné Molné	Viktor Klima	February 16, 2009
November 1, 2008	April 15, 2009	Marta Salvat Batista	Chargé d'affaires	Albert Pintat	Werner Faymann	June 15, 2009
