= Cristina Rodriguez Galán =

Andorran diplomat (born 1956)

Cristina Rodriguez Galán (born November 28, 1956, in Andorra la Vella) is an Andorran diplomat who was their ambassador to France and Permanent Delegate to UNESCO from June 24, 2015, until 2019. She was also Minister of Health, Welfare and Labour of Andorra.
