= List of ambassadors of Andorra to Portugal =

Coordinates: 38.712569°N 9.165327°W

The Andorran Ambassador has his residence in Lisbon.

== List of heads of mission ==
designated/accredited	ambassador	Observation	List of heads of government of Andorra	Prime Minister of Portugal	Term end
November 20, 1996	Pere Altimir Pintat		Marc Forné Molné	Jorge Sampaio	2001
2001	Antoni Calvó Armengol		Marc Forné Molné	Jorge Sampaio	July 18, 2007
2008	Jaume Gaytán Sansa		Albert Pintat	Aníbal Cavaco Silva	2009
January 12, 2012	Maria Ubach i Font	(* 14 juin 1973 à La Massana)	Antoni Martí	Pedro Passos Coelho	June 17, 2015
June 17, 2015	Jaume Serra Serra		Antoni Martí	Pedro Passos Coelho	
