= Lídia Armengol i Vila =

- Born: 13 September 1948; Andorra la Vella, Andorra
- Died: 26 November 1991 (aged 43); Andorra la Vella, Andorra
- Occupation(s): Historian, civil servant
- Known for: The Andorranization Program
- Awards: 1987 Principality of Andorra Prize

Lídia Armengol i Vila (13 September 1948 – 26 November 1991) was an Andorran historian and civil servant who championed the restoration of her country's historic language and culture.

== Biography ==
Armengol was born in the old quarter of Andorra la Vella, the capital city of Andorra (a landlocked microstate in the Pyrenees mountains). She attended primary classes in a French school there and then went to the University of Perpignan in nearby France, where she continued her education at the Lycée Jean Lurçat. She graduated from the Spanish section of Letters in 1971. The following year she obtained her master's degree (Maîtrise d'Enseignement) at the same university. In 1978, she received the Diploma of Advanced Studies (DEA) in the specialty of Andorran Studies at the University of Perpignan. In 1984, she took a course in historical demography at the École d'Hautes Études de Sciencies in Paris, France.

=== Government service ===
According to writer Antoni Pol, "Her contribution has been twofold, in two dimensions, politics and culture."

Armengol was a promoter of the "Andorranization Program," which she proposed in 1970 when she was about 22 years of age. The program became the basis of the country's public school system which, in turn, led to widespread cultural awareness.

"These were years in which the institutionalisation of culture was framed as part of a process of reform directed at the country's political institutions, resulting, twenty years later in a constituent process and the passing of the Constitution of 14 March 1993, making Andorra an independent state that followed the rule of law and enjoyed a social welfare system."

On 1 March 1973, she was appointed co-head of the country's Pedagogical Department, with Antoni Morell i Mora, and was later appointed General Secretary of the Department of Social Affairs, eventually heading the Department of Education, Culture and Sports.

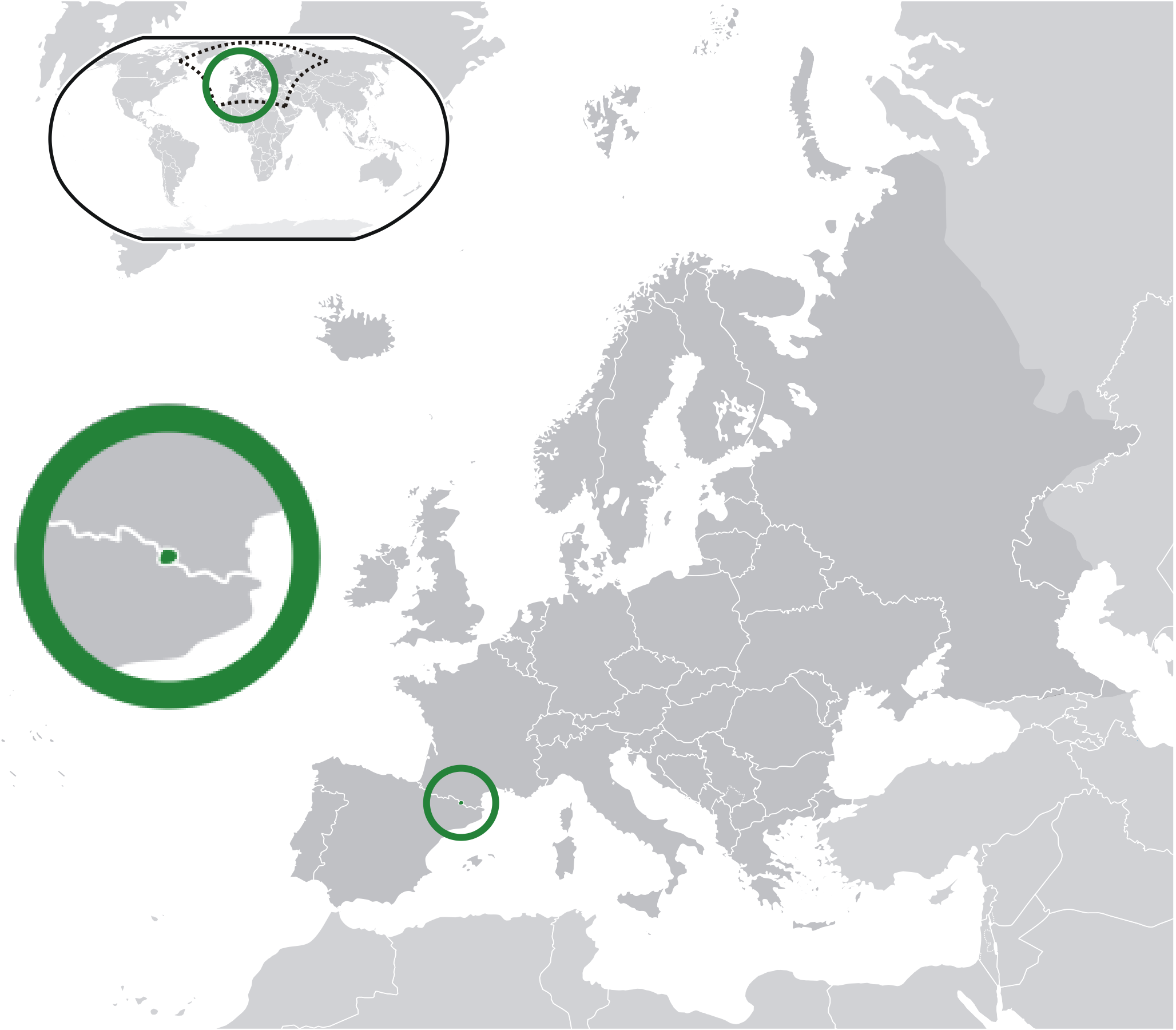
Location of Andorra (green dot) in the mountains between southern France and northern Spain.

She helped organize the teaching of the Catalan language, Andorran geography and history, and the establishment of Andorran institutions near the centers of Spanish and French education in the country, creating the Andorran Training program.

In 1975 she created the National Library of Andorra and then the National Archives. Then, a year later, the General Counsel created the Institute of Andorran Studies and put Armengol in its leadership position. The Institute's aim was,

"to promote the historical research and the dissemination of scientific knowledge. The person put in charge of the new institute's organization of historical and cultural knowledge was the historian Lidia Armengol. ... Armengol published collections of key materials for research and prepared historical overviews that laid the groundwork for writing the history of the country and encourage young people to take an interest in their roots and in their own language and culture. The mythologised history of this Pyrenean enclave began to give way to a rigorous and critical historical account within a framework that generated many more studies, which were also aimed at the internationalisation of knowledge on Andorra."

During the government of prime minister Òscar Ribas Reig (1982 –1984), Armengol was appointed Director of Culture and Fine Arts. When the next government took over, the new prime minister, Josep Pintat i Solans, appointed her to the position of General Secretary of the Ministry of Education and Culture. In 1990, when Ribas returned to the top government post, she was appointed Deputy Secretary General of the Presidency.

=== Historical research ===
In parallel with her political work, she continued her historical research, publishing numerous works about her country's Catalan language and culture. She was awarded the 1987 Principality of Andorra Prize, for Social Behaviors and Collective Mentalities: the Andorran ecclesiastical legacies of the 19th century.

=== Death ===
Lídia Armengol died at the Hospital Nostra Senyora de Meritxell in Andorra la Vella on 26 November 1991 at 43 years of age, after a long illness. Her funeral was held the next day in the city's parish church of Sant Esteve (Església de Sant Esteve), attended by more than a thousand mourners.

== Legacy ==
- In 1998 the Government of Andorra and the Institut d'Estudis Andorrans published a book in her memory which collected the memories of those who had known her both personally and professionally.
- In 2007 the magazine Àgora Cultural dedicated a monograph to her, which she shared with the then also deceased Manel Mas i Ribó, her personal friend and colleague in the Government.
- In 2012, a city square in Andorra la Vella, the capital city of Andorra, was renamed Plaça Lídia Armengol.
- The Government of Andorra, through the Ministry of Culture, offers the Lídia Armengol Vila grant, each year, which is intended to promote linguistic or sociolinguistic studies based on the Catalan language of Andorra.
- Her portrait appeared on an Andorran stamp valued at 1.20 euros.

== Selected publications ==
According to WorldCat in 2020, Armengol has 15 works in 56 publications in 4 languages in library holding around the world.

- 1978 Andorra ... some time ago: (1st and 2nd series). Prades: Terra Nostra
- 1978 Materials for a bibliography of Andorra. [Andorra]: Institut d'Estudis Andorrans. Center of Perpignan
- 1980 The General Council (1682-1979): chronological collection of the Andorran patricians. With Manuel Mas and Antoni Morell
- 1983 Approach to the history of Andorra. Andorra: Institut d'Estudis Andorrans. Center of Perpignan
- 1985 A sample of our historical legacy: 600 institutional, economic and social events
- 1987 The parish of Ordino in the 19th century: a demographic-historical study. [Andorra]: Institut d'Estudis Andorrans. Center of Perpignan ( ISBN 99913-7-002-1 )
- 1988 Social behaviors and collective mentalities: the Andorran ecclesiastical legacies of the 19th century. Andorra: Consell General ( ISBN 99913-8-002-7 )
