= Ministry of External Affairs (Andorra) =

Government ministry of Andorra

Ministry of External Affairs of the Principality of Andorra
- Ministeri d'Afers Exteriors del Principat d'Andorra

Ministry overview
- Formed: 1993
- Type: Ministry
- Headquarters: Andorra la Vella
- Minister responsible: Imma Tor Faus
- Parent department: Government of Andorra
- Website: www.exteriors.ad/en/

The Ministry of Foreign Affairs (Catalan: Ministeri d'Afers Exteriors) is the Andorran government ministry which oversees the foreign relations of Andorra.

== List ==
- Antoni Armengol (1993–1994)
- Marc Vila Amigó (1994)
- Manuel Mas Ribó (1994–1997)
- Albert Pintat (1997–2001)
- Juli Minoves Triquell (12 April 2001 – 7 May 2007)
- Meritxell Mateu i Pi (2007–2009)
- Xavier Espot Miró (8 June 2009 – 2011)
- Gilbert Saboya Sunyé (16 May 2011 – 17 July 2017)
- Maria Ubach i Font (17 July 2017 – 16 May 2023)
- Imma Tor Faus (since 17 May 2023)

== Structure ==
- Department of Bilateral and Consular Affairs
- Department of Multilateral Affairs and Cooperation

== See also ==
- Foreign relations of Andorra
