= Miquel Àngel Canturri Montanya =

Andorran diplomat

Ambassador of Andorra to the Holy See
- In office December 16, 2010 – December 15, 2011
- Preceded by: Antoni Morell Mora
- Succeeded by: Jaume Serra Serra

Personal details
- Born: February 20, 1945 (age 81) Andorra la Vella

Miquel Àngel Canturri Montanya (born February 20, 1945) is an Andorran diplomat.

== Career ==
From 1982 to 1984 he was President of the National Body of Administration Andorra Council for Broadcasting and Director of Finance at the Executive Council of Andorra, as well as President of the Bar Association. From 1971 to December 16, 2010, he worked as a lawyer in Andorra, where he resides. He has participated in numerous seminars and conferences on Public Law and Private and Ongoing Formation in Law in France, Spain and Italy. From December 16, 2010, to December 15, 2011, he was ambassador of the Principality of Andorra to the Holy See.
