= Juli Minoves =

Andorran diplomat and politician

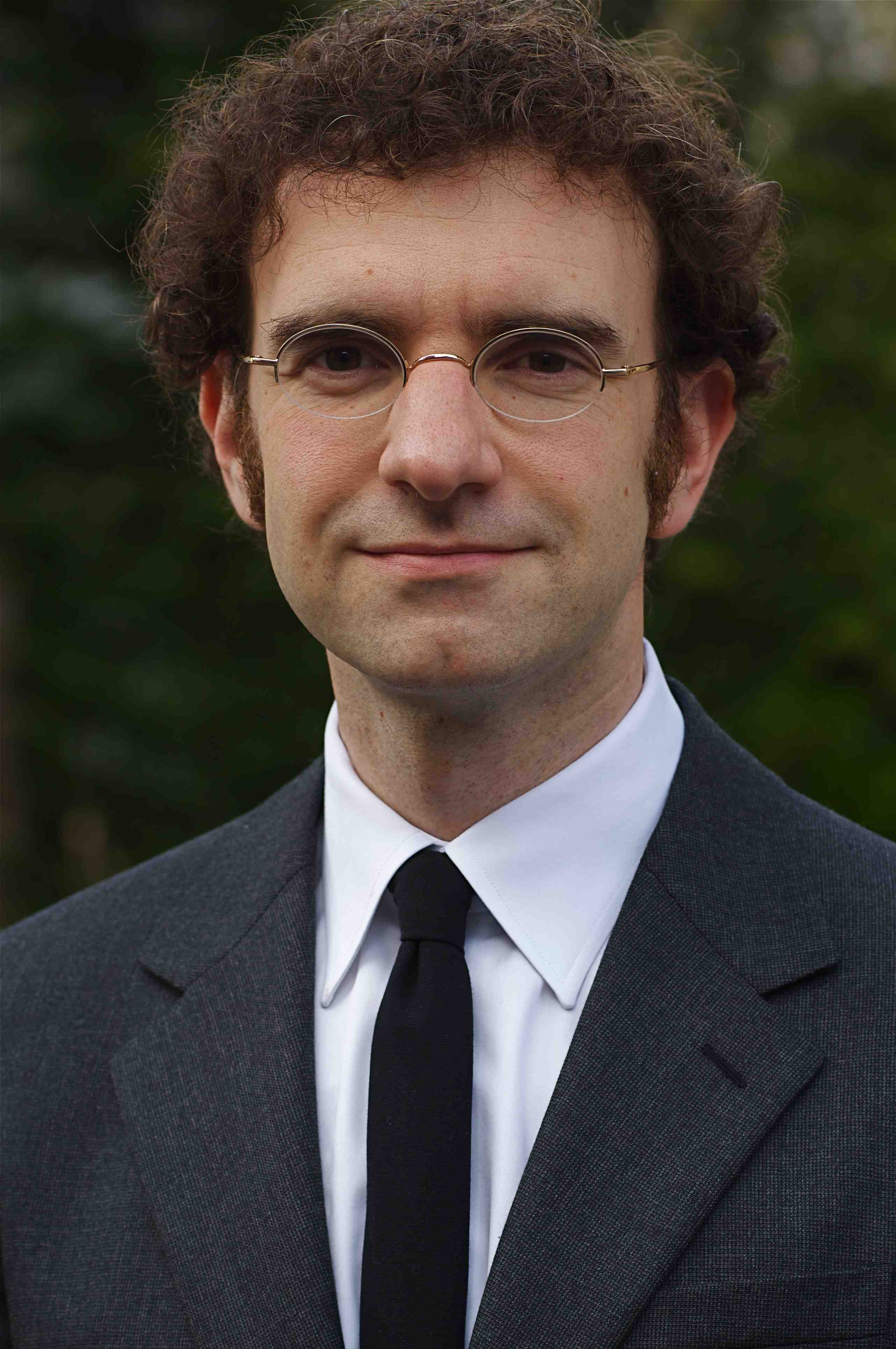
- Minoves in 2008

President of Liberal International
- In office 26 April 2014 – 30 November 2018
- Preceded by: Hans van Baalen
- Succeeded by: Hakima El Haite

Minister of Foreign Affairs
- In office 12 April 2001 – 7 May 2007
- Prime Minister: Marc Forné Molné; Albert Pintat
- Preceded by: Albert Pintat
- Succeeded by: Meritxell Mateu i Pi

Personal details
- Born: 15 August 1969 (age 57) Andorra la Vella, Andorra
- Party: Liberal Party
- Education: University of Fribourg; Yale University

Juli Minoves i Triquell (Catalan pronunciation: [ˈʒuli miˈnɔβəs]; born 15 August 1969) is an Andorran diplomat, author, and the 13th President of Liberal International.

== Biography ==
Minoves was educated as an economist (University of Fribourg) and Political Scientist (Yale University).

Minoves served as Foreign Minister of Andorra from 12 April 2001 until 7 May 2007, at which point in time he was appointed Minister of Public Affairs (Government Spokesman), of Culture and Higher Education. From December 2007 until May 2009 he was Minister of Public Affairs, of Economic Development, Tourism, Culture and Universities.

Previously to his ministerial positions, Minoves had served Andorra as Ambassador Permanent representative to the United Nations, Ambassador to the United States of America, to Canada, the United Kingdom, Spain, Switzerland, Finland, and the World Trade Organization.

Minoves is vice president and member of the bureau (twice elected) of Liberal International. In 2014, he was elected President of Liberal International by the 59th Congress, which convened in Rotterdam, The Netherlands. He was succeeded as president by Hakima El Haite on 30 November 2018.

Minoves is currently an Assistant Professor of Political Science at the University of La Verne in Southern California.

== Published works ==
He is the author of multiple works of fiction, among which his novel Segles de Memòria was awarded with the Fiter i Rossell Prize in 1989.

Political offices
Preceded by Albert Pintat	Minister of Foreign Affairs; 2001–2007	Succeeded by Meritxell Mateu i Pi
Party political offices
Preceded by Hans van Baalen	President of Liberal International; 2014–2018	Incumbent
