= Union of Ibero-American Capital Cities =

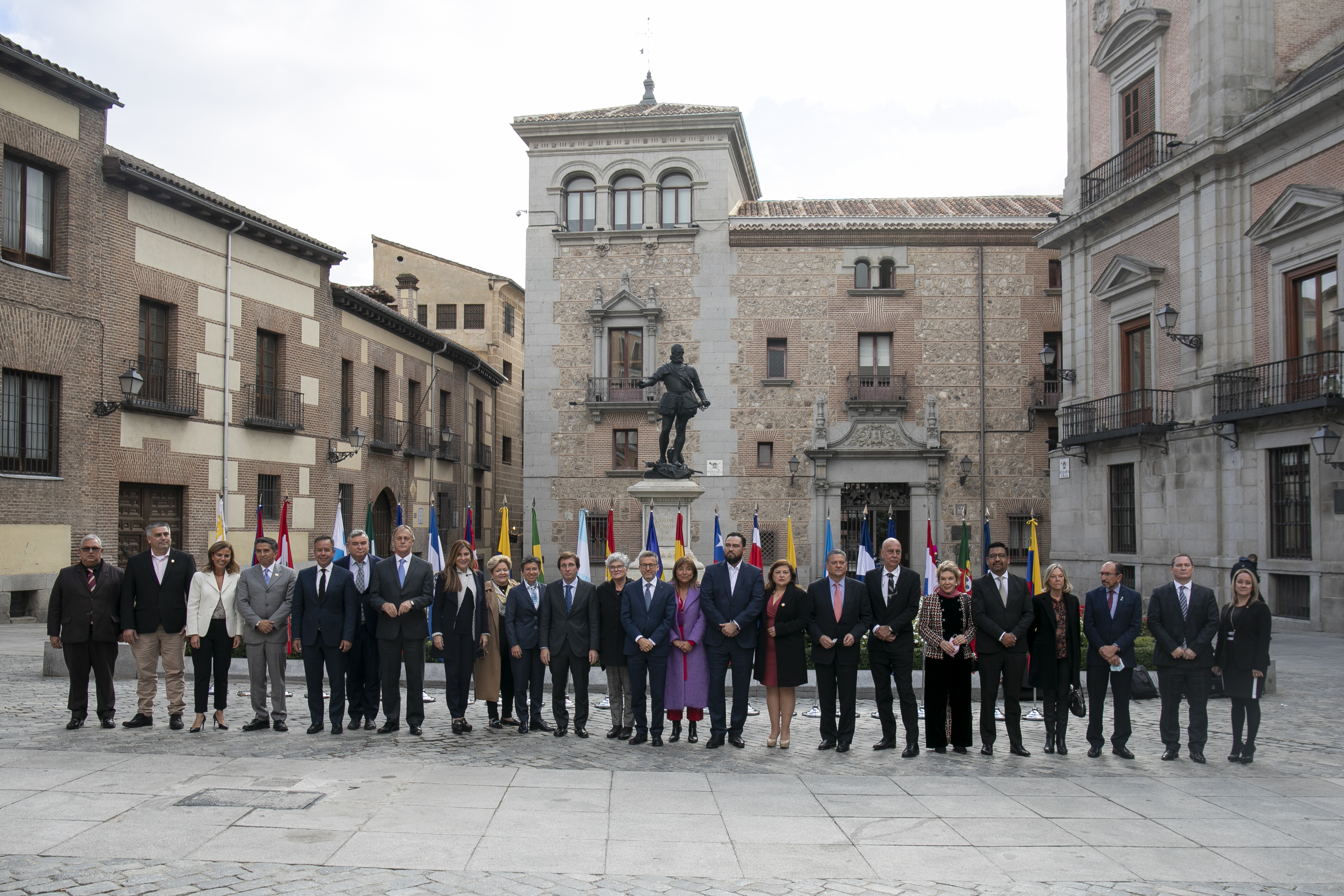
2021 summit of the Union of Ibero-American Capital Cities in Madrid, Spain

The Union of Ibero-American Capital Cities, UCCI (Spanish: Unión de Ciudades Capitales Iberoamericanas and Portuguese: União de Cidades Capitais Ibero-americanas), is an international, non-governmental organization of several major Ibero-American cities that fosters ties and friendly relations between its members. The organization was founded in Madrid on 12 October 1982. The organisation's headquarters are in Madrid.

== Members ==
There are 25 full members of the UCCI, most of them capitals of their respective states. These members are:

- Andorra la Vella, Andorra
- Asunción, Paraguay
- Bogotá, Colombia
- Brasília, Brazil
- Buenos Aires, Argentina
- Caracas, Venezuela
- Guatemala City, Guatemala
- Havana, Cuba
- Quito, Ecuador
- La Paz, Bolivia
- Lima, Peru
- Lisbon, Portugal
- Madrid, Spain
- Managua, Nicaragua
- Mexico City, Mexico
- Montevideo, Uruguay
- Panama City, Panama
- Rio de Janeiro, Brazil
- San Jose, Costa Rica
- San Juan, Puerto Rico
- San Salvador, El Salvador
- Santiago, Chile
- Santo Domingo, Dominican Republic
- Sucre, Bolivia
- Tegucigalpa, Honduras

The UCCI also has 4 associate members:

- Barcelona, Spain
- Cádiz, Spain
- Port-au-Prince, Haiti
- São Paulo, Brazil
