= Antoni Morell Mora =

Spanish writer (1941–2020)

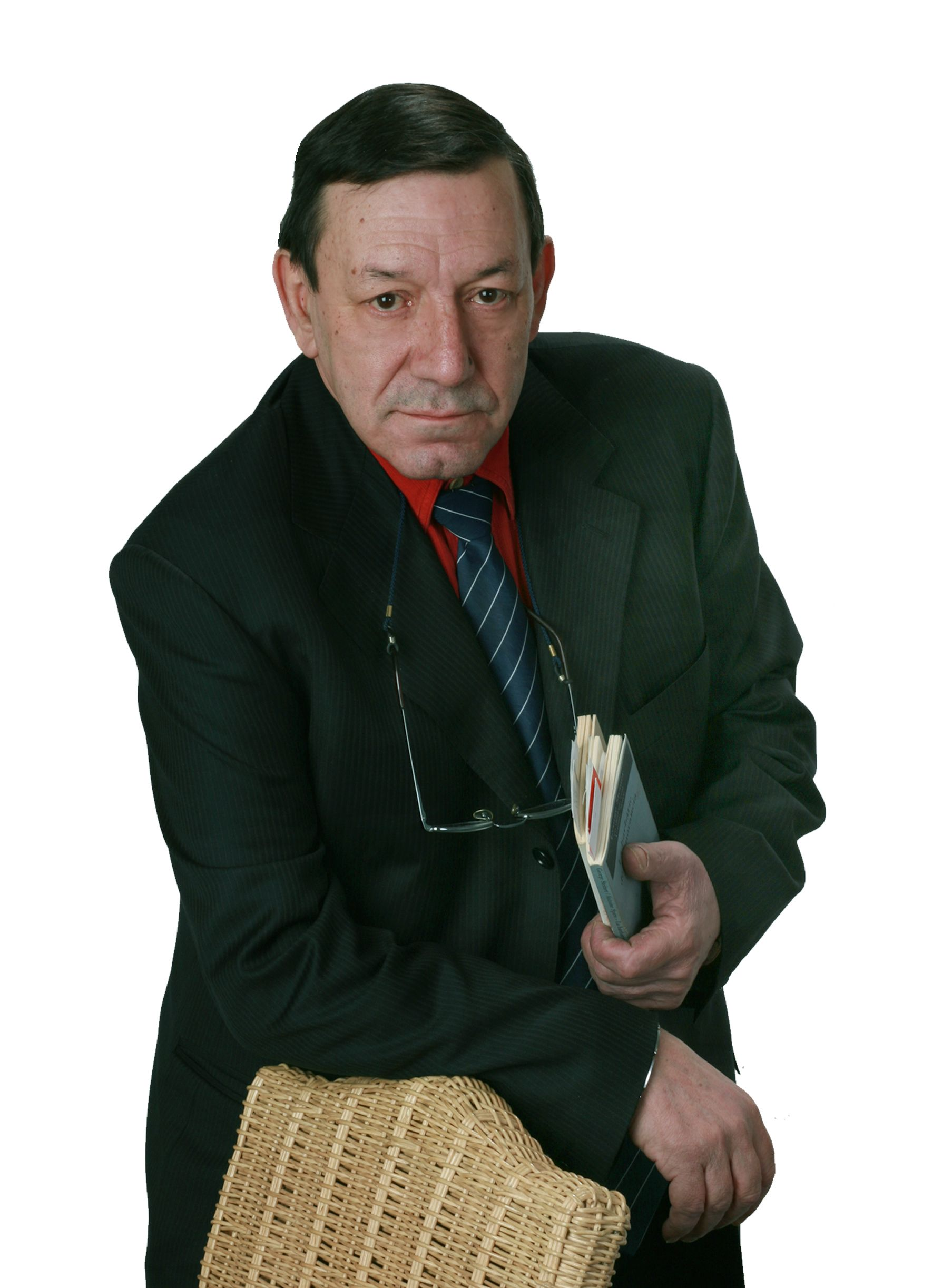

Ambassador of Andorra to the Holy See
- In office December 1, 2005 – December 1, 2010
- Preceded by: Géraldine Sasplugas Requena
- Succeeded by: Miquel Àngel Canturri Montanya

Personal details
- Born: December 14, 1941 Barcelona, Spain
- Died: January 5, 2020 (aged 78) Andorra la Vella, Andorra
- Education: seminary studies, law
- Alma mater: Universidad de Zaragoza, Universitat de Barcelona, Conciliar Seminary of Barcelona

Antoni Morell Mora (14 December 1941 – 5 January 2020) was a Spanish-born Andorran diplomat, civil servant, writer and lawyer.

== Career ==
From 1972 to 1973 he was appointed Pedagogical advisor of the General Council with Lídia Armengol i Vila. From then until 1981 he was Secretary of Sindicatura General, then from 1981 to 1984 he was General Secretary of the First Andorran Government. From 1984 to 2004 he privately practiced as a lawyer. From December 1, 2005 to December 1, 2010 he was ambassador of the Principality of Andorra to the Holy See.

He regularly collaborated with several magazines and was President of the Association of Writers of the Principality. He wrote numerous essays on sociology, geography, history and legal disciplines. He won several national and international awards for his literary activities.

== Personal life ==
Mora was born in Barcelona to a Spaniard taxi driver from Alpicat (Lerida) and a housekeeper who was an heiress in Andorra. The family later moved from Spain to Andorra. He also had an older sibling, Montserrat Morell Mora. Mora attended Conciliar Seminary of Barcelona for seminary studies but was not ordained as deacon. He went on to study history at Universidad de Zaragoza (1969) and law at Universitat de Barcelona (1976).
