= La Margineda =

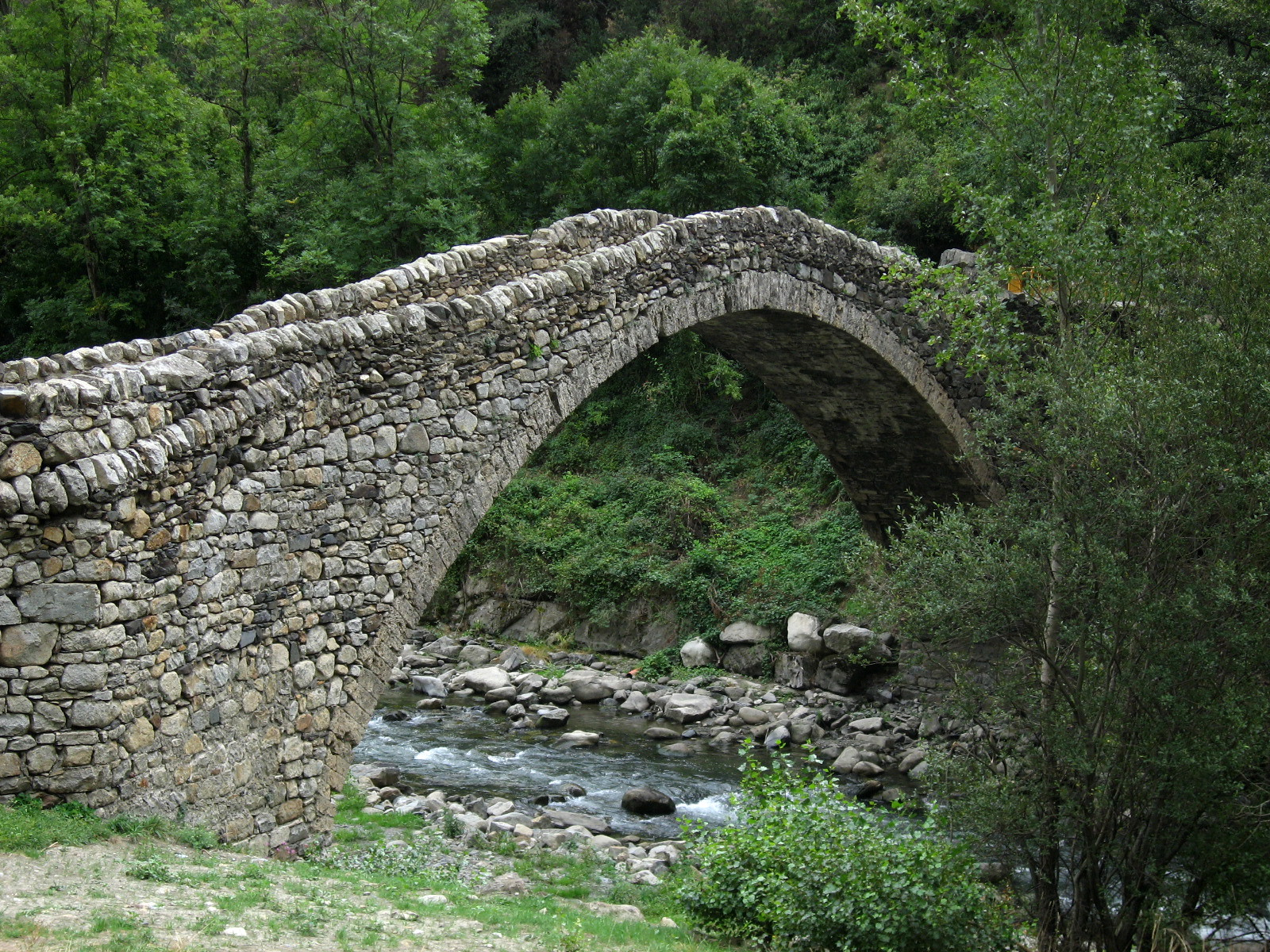
- The 12th-century Romanesque bridge, Pont de la Margineda

- Location in Andorra
- Coordinates: 42°29′9″N 1°29′26″E
- Country: Andorra
- Parish: Andorra la Vella
- Highest elevation: 990 m (3,250 ft)
- Lowest elevation: 920 m (3,020 ft)

La Margineda (Catalan pronunciation: [la maɾ(d)ʒiˈneða]) is an Andorran village located in the parish of Andorra la Vella. It is noted for its 12th-century Romanesque bridge, Pont de la Margineda, which is the best preserved and largest such bridge in Andorra, being 33 metres long and 9.2 metres tall.

The Instituto Español de Andorra (IEA), a Spanish international secondary school, is in La Margineda.

== See also ==
- Santa Coloma
