= Elidà Amigó i Montanya =

Andorran historian, archivist, activist, and suffragist (1935–2020)

Elidà Amigó i Montanya (5 September 1935 – 9 September 2020) was an Andorran historian, archivist, activist, and suffragist. A leader in the feminist movement, that led to Andorran women gaining the right to vote in 1970, she was also an academic expert on the history and sociology of the microstate of Andorra. She has been described as "the first Andorran intellectual to bring critical awareness to the condition of women" in the principality.

== Biography ==
Elidà Amigó i Montanya was born in the capital city of Andorra la Vella in 1935. She went to study in Lleida, Spain, and then in 1957 became one of the first Andorran women to obtain a university degree, graduating in philosophy and letters from the University of Zaragoza.

After finishing university, she served as the archivist for the General Council of Andorra until 1969. In this period she became involved in women's rights activism and was a leader in Andorra's suffrage movement, culminating in the 1970 decree that women would be able to vote in the principality.

Amigó Montanya also taught history and French literature at the Sant Ermengol school. She was heavily involved in historical research in Andorra, helping to create the Comitè Andorrà de Ciències Històriques (Andorran Historical Sciences Committee) in the 1980s, and serving as its first president. Her work as a historian included time spent working for the International Committee of Historical Sciences in Laussane, Switzerland. Notable among her written works is the 1971 book 693 anys després, co-authored with Antoni Morell Mora, which aimed to outline a sense of Andorran identity through an examination of the area's history. She was involved in producing Andorra Magazine from the first issue in 1970, later contributing to the magazine Posobra beginning in 1972.

She also led the Fundació Clara Rabassa for 23 years, worked with the Red Cross, and was on the jury for the Premi Carlemany literary prize from 1994 to 2009. A member of the Andorran Academy of Sciences, she was awarded the Àgora Cultural Prize by the Andorran General Council for her work as a human rights activist and historian in 2012.

After a long illness, Amigó Montanya died in 2020, at age 85.
