= Hans van Baalen =

Dutch politician (1960–2021)

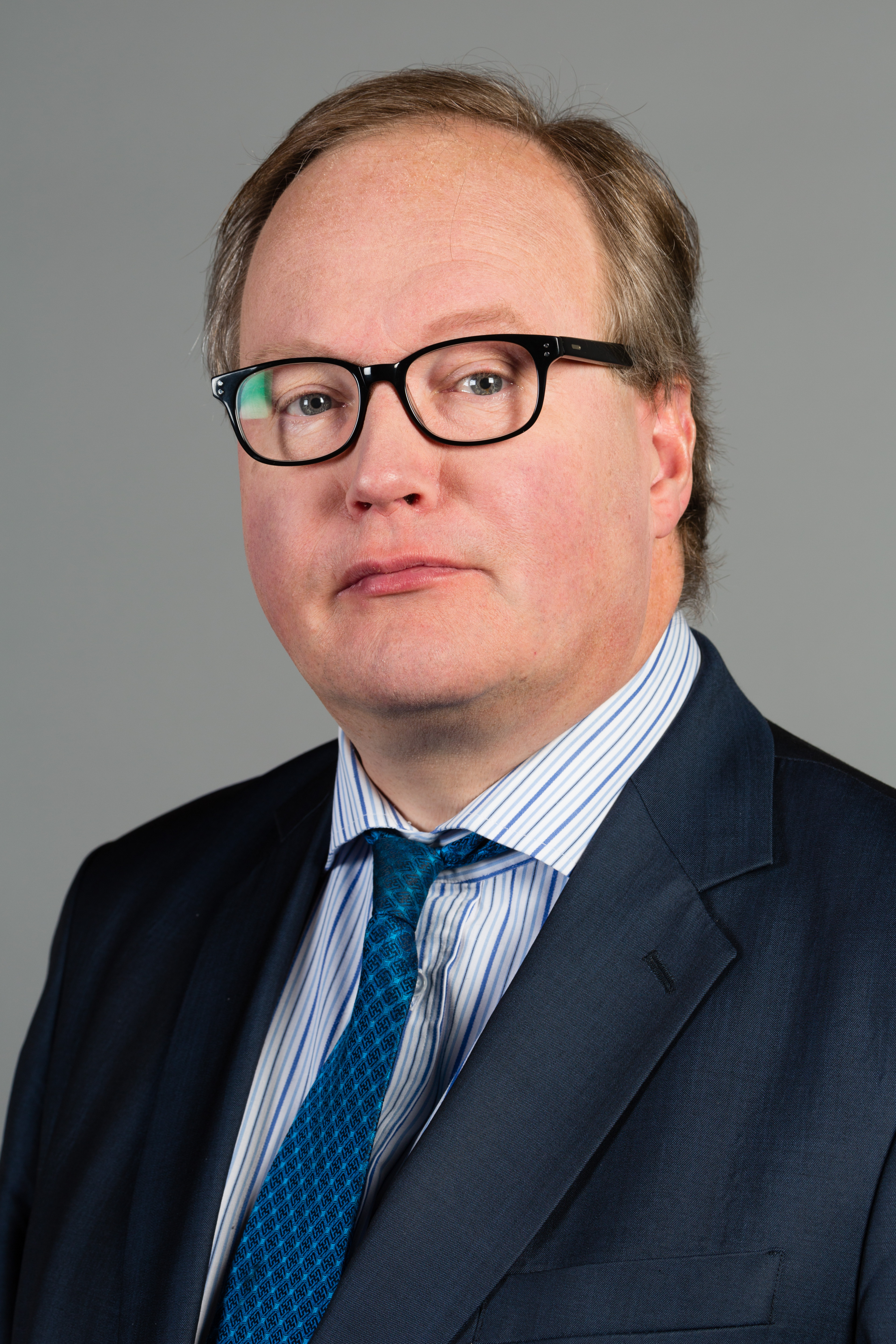

President of the Alliance of Liberals and Democrats for Europe Party
- In office 21 November 2015 – 29 April 2021
- Preceded by: Graham Watson
- Succeeded by: Vacant

Leader of the People's Party for Freedom and Democracy in the European Parliament
- In office 14 July 2009 – 1 July 2019
- Preceded by: Jules Maaten
- Succeeded by: Malik Azmani

Member of the European Parliament
- In office 14 July 2009 – 1 July 2019
- Constituency: Netherlands

President of the Liberal International
- In office 20 April 2009 – 26 April 2014
- Preceded by: John Alderdice
- Succeeded by: Juli Minoves

Member of the House of Representatives
- In office 30 January 2003 – 14 July 2009
- In office 28 September 1999 – 23 May 2002

Personal details
- Born: Johannes Cornelis van Baalen; 17 June 1960 Rotterdam, Netherlands
- Died: 29 April 2021 (aged 60) Rotterdam, Netherlands
- Party: People's Party for Freedom and Democracy (1986–2021)
- Spouse: Ineke Sybesma (m. 2006)
- Children: 1 son
- Education: Leiden University (LLB, LLM, MSc)

Military service
- Allegiance: Netherlands
- Branch/service: Royal Netherlands Army
- Years of service: 1986–2021 (Reserve)
- Rank: Colonel
- Unit: National Reserve Corps

Johannes Cornelis "Hans" van Baalen (17 June 1960 – 29 April 2021) was a Dutch politician of the People's Party for Freedom and Democracy (VVD) who served as a Member of the European Parliament and Leader of the People's Party for Freedom and Democracy in the European Parliament from 2009 until 2019. He also was President of the Alliance of Liberals and Democrats for Europe Party from 21 November 2015 until his death.

Van Baalen, a jurist and management consultant by occupation, worked for Deloitte as Director of Public relations from his graduation in 1988 until 1999. He became a Member of the House of Representatives on 28 September 1999 serving until 23 May 2002. After the Dutch general election of 2003 he was re-elected as Member of the House of Representatives serving from 30 January 2003 until 14 July 2009 when he became Member of the European Parliament. Van Baalen served as President of the Liberal International from 20 April 2009 until 26 April 2014.

== Early life and education ==
Johannes Cornelis van Baalen was born on 17 June 1960 in Rotterdam in the Netherlands.

He went to a public primary school in his hometown Krimpen aan den IJssel and to the high school Krimpenerwaard College in the same town, where he followed the havo (1973–1977) and atheneum (1977–1979) programs.

He studied Dutch law (1979–1986), and international law (1986–1988) at Leiden University. During these student years, he was a member of the Minerva fraternity and the 'Pro Patria' student guard.

== Political career ==
Van Baalen was a member of the VVD since 1986. He was international secretary for the VVD party bureau from 1993 to 1998, and was an MP from 1999 until 2002. He was again made an MP in 2003. Before his political career he worked as a journalist and also with the public relations department of Deloitte Consulting. In the Dutch House of Representatives, van Baalen was a member of the Foreign Affairs commission, European Affairs commission and the Defense commission.

Beginning with the 2009 European elections, van Baalen was a member of European Parliament and faction leader of the Dutch VVD Delegation, and was generally seen as one of the most influential figures within the party. He served as a member of the Committee on Foreign Affairs and its Subcommittee on Security and Defence from 2009. On both committees, he was his parliamentary group’s coordinator. As substitute, he also served on the Committee on International Trade from 2014.

In addition to his committee assignments, van Baalen served as chairman of the parliament’s delegation relations with South Africa. He was previously a member of the delegations with Afghanistan (2010-2014), the United States (2010-2014) and Japan (2009-2014).

In July 2018, van Baalen announced that he would not stand in the 2019 European elections but instead resign by the end of the parliamentary term.

On 11 January 2021, the Dutch government appointed van Baalen as a member of the ‘Eminent Persons Group on the European Economy’ which advises Dutch politics on the EU economy, budgetary, fiscal & monetary policy.

On 19 March 2021, the Council of Ministers, on the proposal of the Minister of Foreign Affairs, agreed to nominate van Baalen for an appointment as a member of the Advisory Council on International Affairs (AIV).

== Political positions ==
=== Relations with Russia and Ukraine ===
Van Baalen was a member of the European Parliament’s monitoring mission during the Ukrainian parliamentary elections in 2014, led by Andrej Plenković. With regard to the conflict with Russia over Ukraine, he argued for higher military spending and NATO involvement, and improved prospects for Ukraine to join the EU if its population so decided.

In 2015, news media reported that van Baalen was included in a Russian blacklist of prominent people from the European Union who are not allowed to enter the country.

In 2016 he received the Ukrainian Order of Merit Third Class, bestowed upon him by president Petro Poroshenko.

=== Car industry ===
Van Baalen worked until September 2015 as a lobbyist for the motoring organisation RAI and was on the supervisory board of Mercedes-Benz. Van Baalen reported those positions to the European Parliament and indicated he refrained from involvement in car-related parliamentary business. In 2014 however, van Baalen, in his capacity as member of European parliament called for standardized rules for the car industry in the European Union and the United States.

== Distinctions ==
- Order of Merit (Ukraine), Third Class.
- Knight of the Order of Orange-Nassau

Party political offices
Preceded by Jules Maaten	Leader of the People's Party for Freedom and Democracy in the European Parliament; 2009–2019	Succeeded by Malik Azmani
Political offices
Preceded by John Alderdice	President of the Liberal International; 2009–2014	Succeeded by Juli Minoves
Preceded by Graham Watson	President of the Alliance of Liberals and Democrats for Europe Party; 2015–2021	Succeeded by Vacant
