= Elida (given name) =

Elida or Élida is a given name. Notable people with the name include:

- Elida Almeida (born 1993), Cape Verdean singer
- Elidà Amigó i Montanya (1935-2020), Andorran historian, archivist, activist, and suffragist
- Elida Aveillé (born 1961), Cuban heptathlete
- Elida Campodónico, Panamanian teacher, women's rights advocate and attorney
- Elida Gera (1931-2017), Israeli film director, dancer, and choreographer
- Elida Morris (1886-1977), American vaudeville singer, comedian and actress
- Élida Passo (1867–1893), Argentine pharmacist
- Elida Rumsey (1842-1819), singer, philanthropist, and Union nurse during the American Civil War
- Elida Reyna (born 1972), Tejano singer
- Élida Stantic (born 1942), better known as Lita Stantic, Argentine cinema producer, screenplay writer, and director
- Élida Vigo, Argentine politician
- Judith Elida Acuña, Argentine politician
