= Instituto Español de Andorra =

Coordinates: 42°29′14″N 01°29′23″E

Information
- Former name: Instituto Nacional de Enseñanza Media en Andorra
- School type: International School
- Established: 1969
- Language: Spanish

Instituto Español de Andorra (IEA) is a Spanish international school in La Margineda, Andorra la Vella, Andorra, operated by the Spanish Ministry of Education. It serves secundaria obligatoria (required secondary education, junior high school) and bachillerato (senior high school/sixth form) education. It was created as the Instituto Nacional de Enseñanza Media en Andorra in 1969.

== See also ==
- Education in Andorra
- List of international schools
