= Imma Tor Faus =

Andorran diplomat and politician

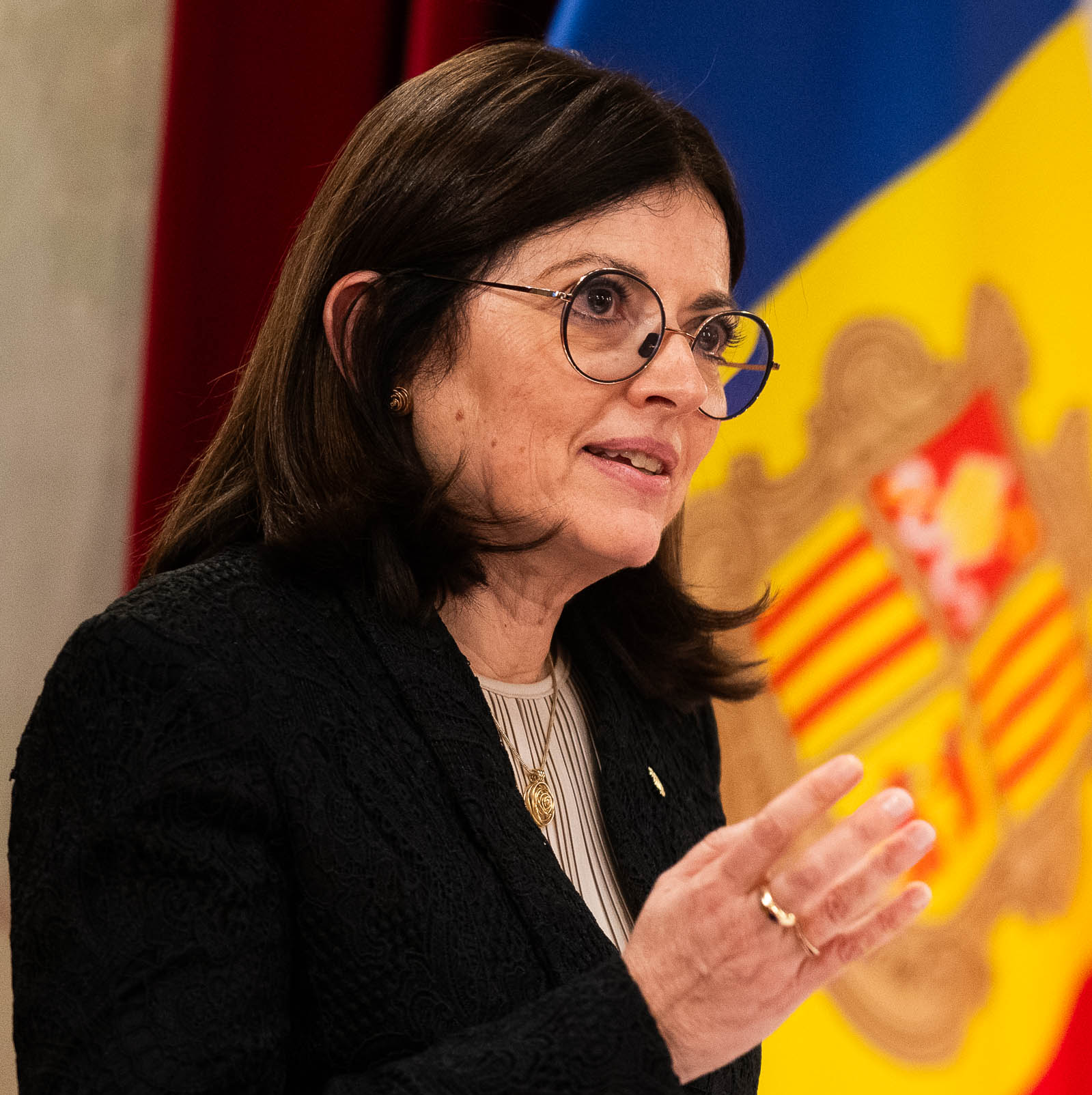
- Tor Faus in 2025

Minister of Foreign Affairs
- Incumbent
- Assumed office 17 May 2023
- Prime Minister: Xavier Espot
- Preceded by: Maria Ubach i Font

Personal details
- Born: 1966 (age 59–60) Sant Julià de Lòria, Andorra
- Party: Democrats for Andorra
- Education: University of Toulouse; Sorbonne University

Imma Tor Faus (born 1966) is an Andorran professor and diplomat who has been the Minister of Foreign Affairs of Andorra since 2023, with extensive diplomatic experience in representing Andorra in several international missions (such as Council of Europe and UNESCO).

== Career ==
Imma Tor Faus was born in Sant Julià de Lòria in 1966.

Tor Faus was a professor of French and literature at the University of Toulouse and the University of Paris.

In 1998, Tor Faus was appointed as Andorra's permanent representative to the Council of Europe, serving until 2004. She was also Ambassador to France from 1999 until 2007 and permanent delegate to UNESCO from 2004 to 2007. From 2007 to 2010, she was Andorra's Ambassador to the European Union in Brussels.

In December 2010, Tor Faus became deputy director of French language at the Organisation internationale de la Francophonie, where she worked until 2023.

In May 2023, Tor Faus was announced as the minister of foreign affairs in the Government of Xavier Espot. She was appointed on 16 May and was sworn in the following day.

== Awards and honours ==
Tor Faus is a Knight of the Legion of Honour and of Arts and Letters, and was awarded a Senghor Medal of the Francophonie.
