= Elida (ship) =

Christian sailing organization in Sweden

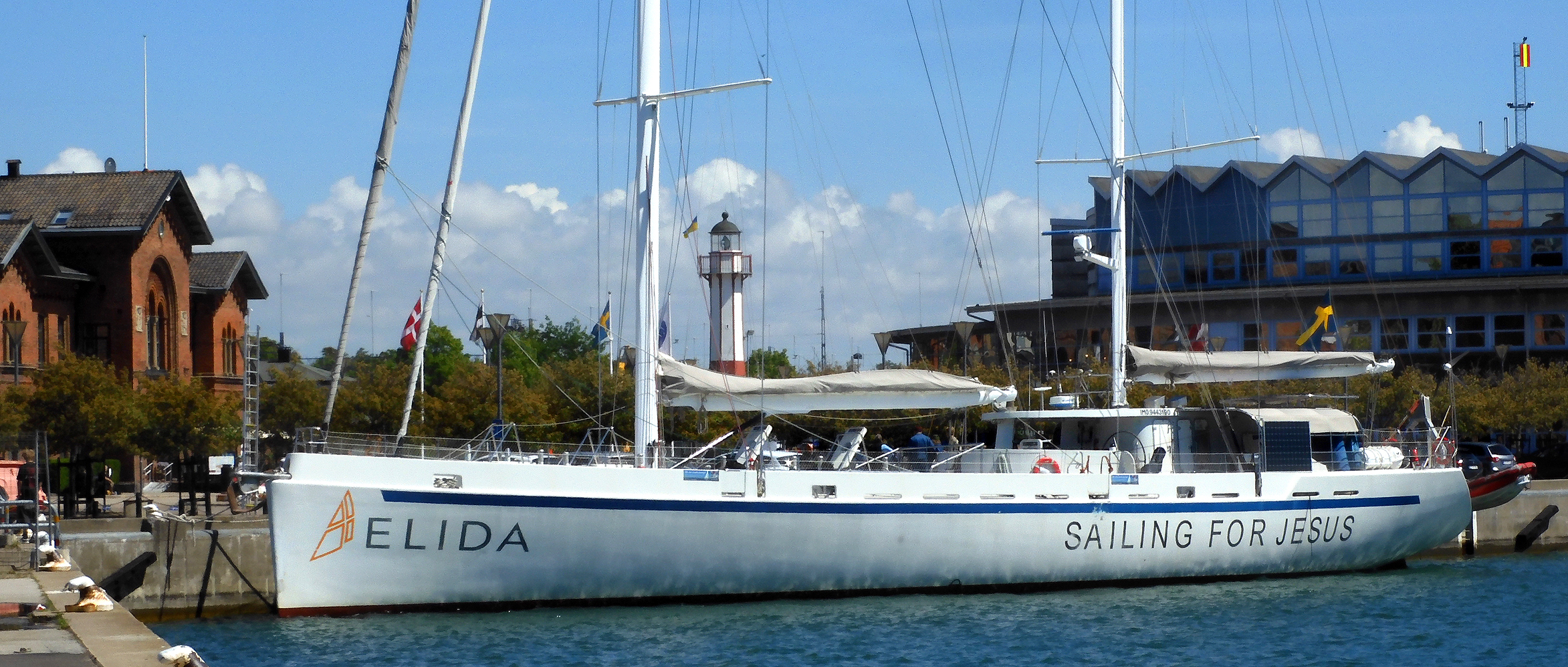
ELIDA visiting Ystad on June 10, 2026.

Elida is a Swedish all-Christian organisation, working under the motto "Sailing for Jesus" with the goal of spreading the message about Jesus Christ via a sailing boat with the same name. During spring and autumn, it sails with mainly youth, but also corporations and other groups. Summertime it tours along the Swedish west coast with singing and music and the Christian message through people's life stories and testimonies. Wintertime it sails in southern Europe. The boat is berthed in Gothenburg, Sweden

== The Missions boat Elida ==
The organisation was founded in 1963 in Kungshamn, Sweden, by the skipper Lennart "Tarren" Abrahamsson, who died following an accident in 1997. In 2002 the organisation was restructured into an association and is now headed by Tarren's son Stefan Abrahamsson. Over the years Elida has become known as the "sailing singing church" and is nowadays a well-known summer profile on the Swedish West Coast.

The work is primarily directed towards the younger generation and sails with some 1,000–1,500 teenagers per year. In addition the boat gathers many thousands of people during all the "dock meetings" in the summer. During the winter part of the year, Elida sails in southern Europe with groups as well as sailing trainees, also called paying crew, which is an opportunity for people in general to sail as crew during a shorter or longer period of time.

== The boat of all churches ==
Elida doesn't belong to any one church or Christian affiliation or denomination. Instead the organisation is said to be "all-Christian" and Elida is "the boat of all churches," open to all who wish to sail along. Elida's crew are all Christian believers, stemming from various church backgrounds and traditions inside and outside Sweden.

== The ships ==
=== Elida V ===
Elida V marked something new and unique in both the history of Elida and boat building in general. The 131 feet (40 m) long sailing boat is a combination of a performance mega yacht and a passenger boat, built in composite. With its mast height of 45 m, 800 m^{2} sail area and only 95 tons in dead weight. The large letters on the sides of the hull also testify of the motto, "Sailing for Jesus." Important key words in the construction were environmentally friendly and the pure sailing experience. Elida V was built by SwedeShip Composite in Hunnebostrand and began to sail in September 2007 after five years of building.

=== Elida IV ===
Of schooner type with steel hull, 235 gross tonnage. Elida IV was built in Gothenburg in 1987–1988 and sold in 2007 to British Marine Reach, a branch organisation under the Christian missions organisation Youth With A Mission.

=== Elida III ===
Originally a cargo ship with steel hull that was re-built at Trellevarvet on Kållandsö (Sweden). She sailed for a while as Norwegian Elida and then as the missions boat Viktoria in Stockholm. She was later sold to Denmark to sail with former addicts.

=== Elida II ===
A sailing vessel with wooden hull, also called "the Wooden Elida." Today she is a café boat in Oslo, Norway.

=== Elida I ===
An English cutter that Lennart "Tarren" Abrahamsson bought. Elida I sailed two seasons before it was badly damaged.

== Elida Mission ==
The Elida Association also heads Elida Mission, which works with missions work abroad. Today this is mainly conducted via some orphanages (children centres) in southern India, out of which some 200 churches have been founded.
