= Maria Ubach i Font =

Andorran diplomat and politician

Her Excellency Maria Ubach i Font
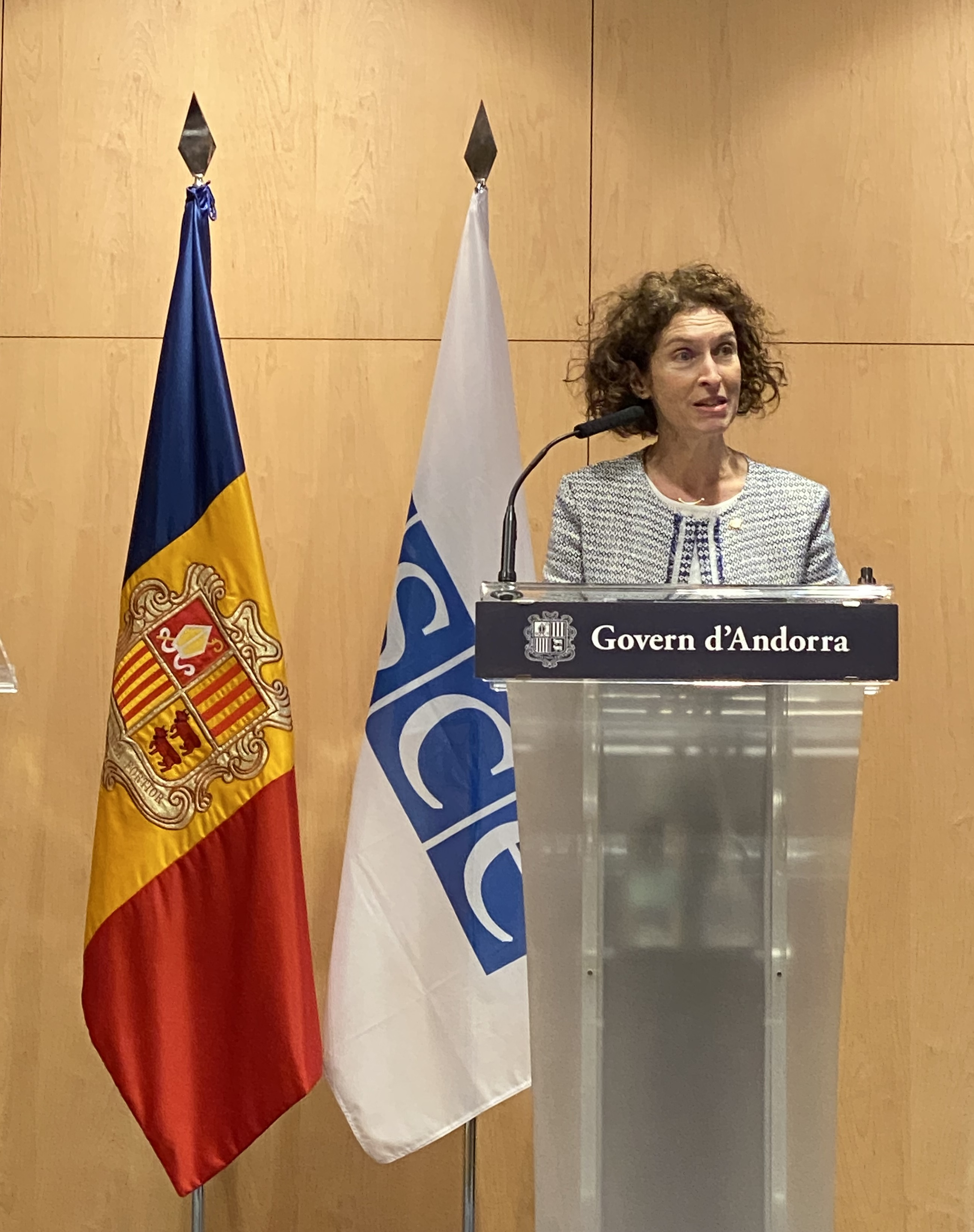
- Ubach in 2022

Minister of Foreign Affairs of Andorra
- In office 17 July 2017 – 16 May 2023
- Prime Minister: Antoni Martí; Xavier Espot
- Preceded by: Gilbert Saboya Sunyé
- Succeeded by: Imma Tor Faus

Personal details
- Born: 14 June 1973 (age 53) La Massana, Andorra
- Party: Democrats for Andorra
- Education: University of Toulouse-Jean Jaurès; Sorbonne University

Maria Ubach i Font (born 14 June 1973) is an Andorran diplomat who served as the Minister of Foreign Affairs from 17 June 2017 to 16 May 2023 under the governments of Prime Minister Antoni Martí and the current Head Xavier Espot.

In 1998 she obtained a degree in economics from the University of Toulouse II-Le Mirail and a master's degree in International Relations from the University of Paris I Panthéon-Sorbonne.

== Political and diplomatic career ==
In 1998 she began her career at the Ministry of Foreign Affairs of Andorra as a technician. Until 2001 she was a permanent representative attached to the Council of Europe in Strasbourg. Between 2001 and 2006 she was the first secretary at the Embassy of Andorra in France and a permanent delegate attached to UNESCO. From 2006 until 2011, she was director of the Multilateral Affairs and Cooperation office of the Ministry.

Between October 2011 and June 2015 she was ambassador in France and Portugal (residing in Paris), as well as being a permanent delegate to UNESCO and representative to the Permanent Council of La Francophonie. Between 2015 and 2017 she was Ambassador to Belgium, the Netherlands, Luxembourg, Germany and the European Union, residing in Brussels.

As Minister, Ubach is leading the negotiations for an association agreement between Andorra and the European Union. She was reappointed by newly elected Prime Minister Xavier Espot on 22 May 2019. On 17 May 2023 she was succeeded by Imma Tor Faus.
