= List of storms named Elida =

The name Elida has been used for eight tropical cyclones in the Eastern Pacific Ocean:

- Hurricane Elida (1984) – a Category 4 hurricane that did not affect land
- Hurricane Elida (1990) – a Category 1 hurricane that affected Socorro Island
- Tropical Storm Elida (1996) – killed six people offshore Mexico
- Hurricane Elida (2002) – a Category 5 hurricane that did not affect land
- Hurricane Elida (2008) – a Category 2 hurricane that affected Mexico and Hawaii
- Tropical Storm Elida (2014) – affected Mexico
- Hurricane Elida (2020) – a Category 2 hurricane that affected Mexico
- Tropical Storm Elida (2026) – a strong tropical storm that did not affect land

== See also ==
- Tropical Storm Elinah (1983) – a South-West Indian Ocean tropical cyclone with a similar name
- Cyclone Elita (2004) – another South-West Indian Ocean tropical cyclone with a similar name
