= Meritxell Mateu i Pi =

Andorran politician

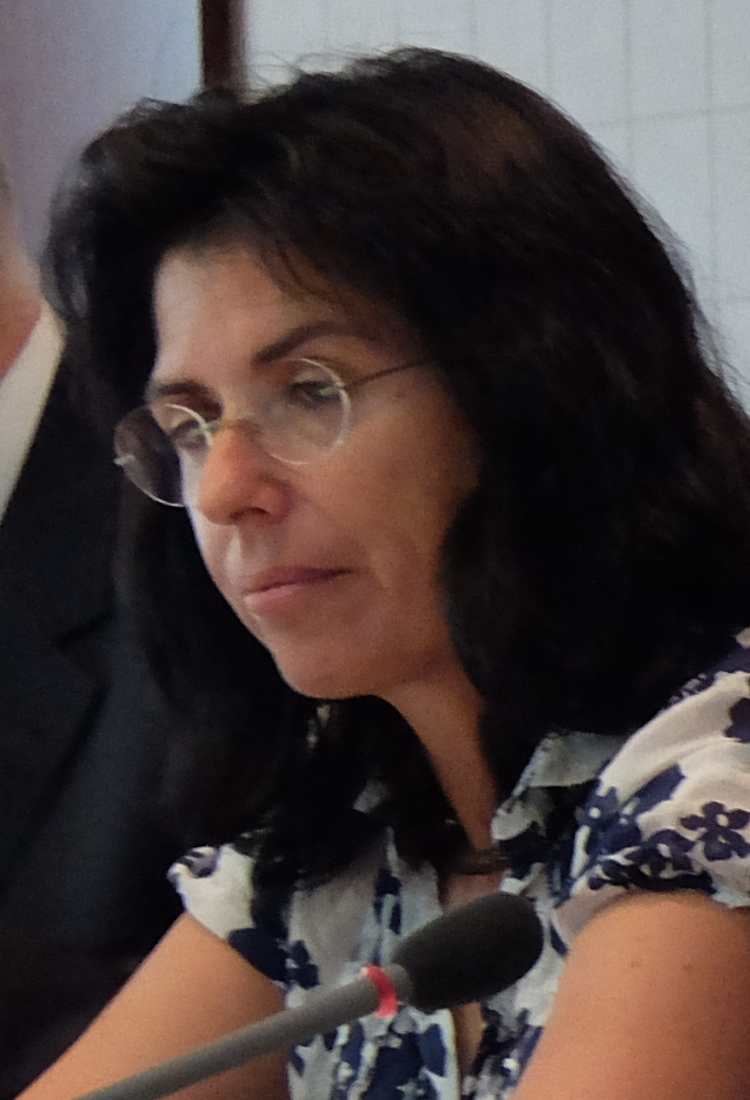
Mateu i Pi in 2014

Meritxell Mateu i Pi (born January 19, 1966) is an Andorran politician, member of the Partit Liberal d'Andorra who served as Minister of Foreign Affairs from 2007 to 2009, being the first female to hold this office. Previous positions she has held include ambassadorships to France, Benelux, the European Union, UNESCO, and the Council of Europe.

In 2011 she became a member of the Andorran Parliament. In November 2011 Mateu alongside Gilbert Saboya Sunyé visited Berlin and met with representatives of Germany as she was part of the Foreign Affairs committee of the Andorran Parliament. From 2011 to 2016, she was a member of the Parliamentary Assembly of the Council of Europe. During her time in parliament, she was Vice President of the Alliance of Liberals and Democrats for Europe from 2013 until 2016. She resigned as a member of the Andorran Parliament in October 2016 after it was revealed that she had an employment relationship with Banca Privada d'Andorra in 2012 and 2013 through a Panamanian company, which led her to influence the government and parliament in favor of private interests.

In 2022, the Court of Cortes sentenced Mateu to 18 months of imprisonment, and she was disqualified from holding public office for five years alone and had a fine imposed based on her relationship with the bank. Mateu announced that she would appeal the sentence soon after and said it was a set-up. The High Court confirmed the conviction for corruption in 2023 and increased her sentence to 2 1/2 years of conditional imprisonment. She later became a midwife of the Ordino quarter in 2025.
