= Albert Pintat =

Prime Minister of Andorra

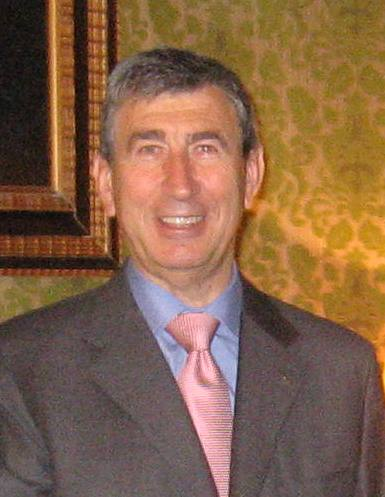
- Pintat in 2009

Prime Minister of Andorra
- In office 27 May 2005 – 5 June 2009
- Monarchs: French: Jacques Chirac; Nicolas Sarkozy; Episcopal: Joan Enric Vives Sicília
- Representative: French: Philippe Massoni; Emmanuelle Mignon; Christian Frémont; Spanish: Nemesi Marqués Oste
- Preceded by: Marc Forné Molné
- Succeeded by: Jaume Bartumeu

Minister of Foreign Affairs of Andorra
- In office 1997–2001
- Prime Minister: Marc Forné Molné
- Preceded by: Manuel Mas Ribó
- Succeeded by: Juli Minoves Triquell

Member of the General Council of Andorra
- In office 1986–1991

Personal details
- Born: 23 June 1943 (age 83) Sant Julià de Lòria, Andorra
- Party: Liberal Party of Andorra
- Spouse: Carmen Rossell
- Education: University of Fribourg

Albert Pintat Santolària (Catalan: [əlˈβεɾt pinˈtat səntuˈlaɾiə]; born 23 June 1943) is an Andorran citizen who served as the prime minister of Andorra from 27 May 2005 to 5 June 2009.

Pintat graduated from the University of Fribourg in Switzerland in 1967, majoring in economics.

He is a member of the Liberal Party of Andorra and was the foreign minister of Andorra from 1997 to 2001. He also served as Ambassador to the European Union (1995 to 1997) and to Switzerland and the United Kingdom (2001 to 2004).

He held the position of head of government since being appointed by the General Council on 27 May 2005 until 5 June 2009.

Pinat is married to Carmen Rossell.

Political offices
Preceded by Marc Forné Molné	Prime Minister of Andorra; 2005–2009	Succeeded by Jaume Bartumeu
