= Andorra la Vella =

Capital of Andorra

- Capital city
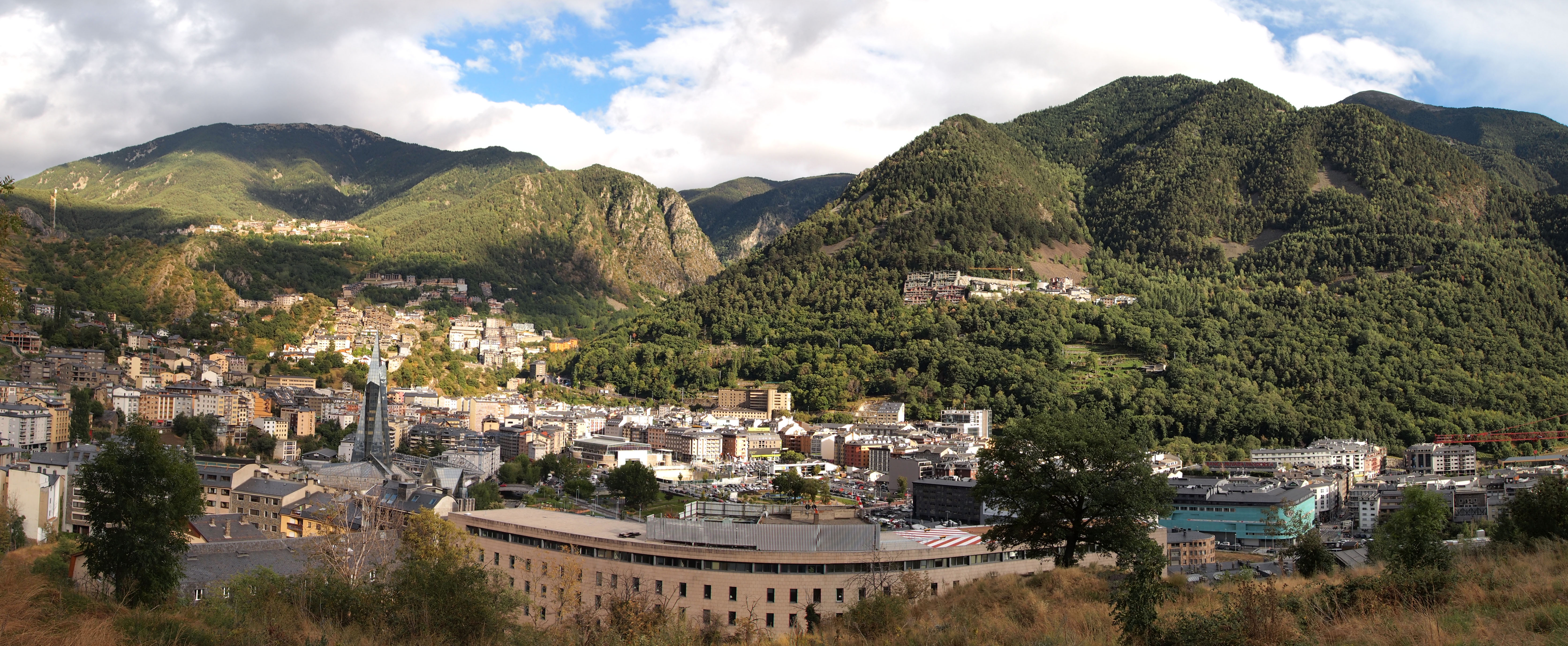
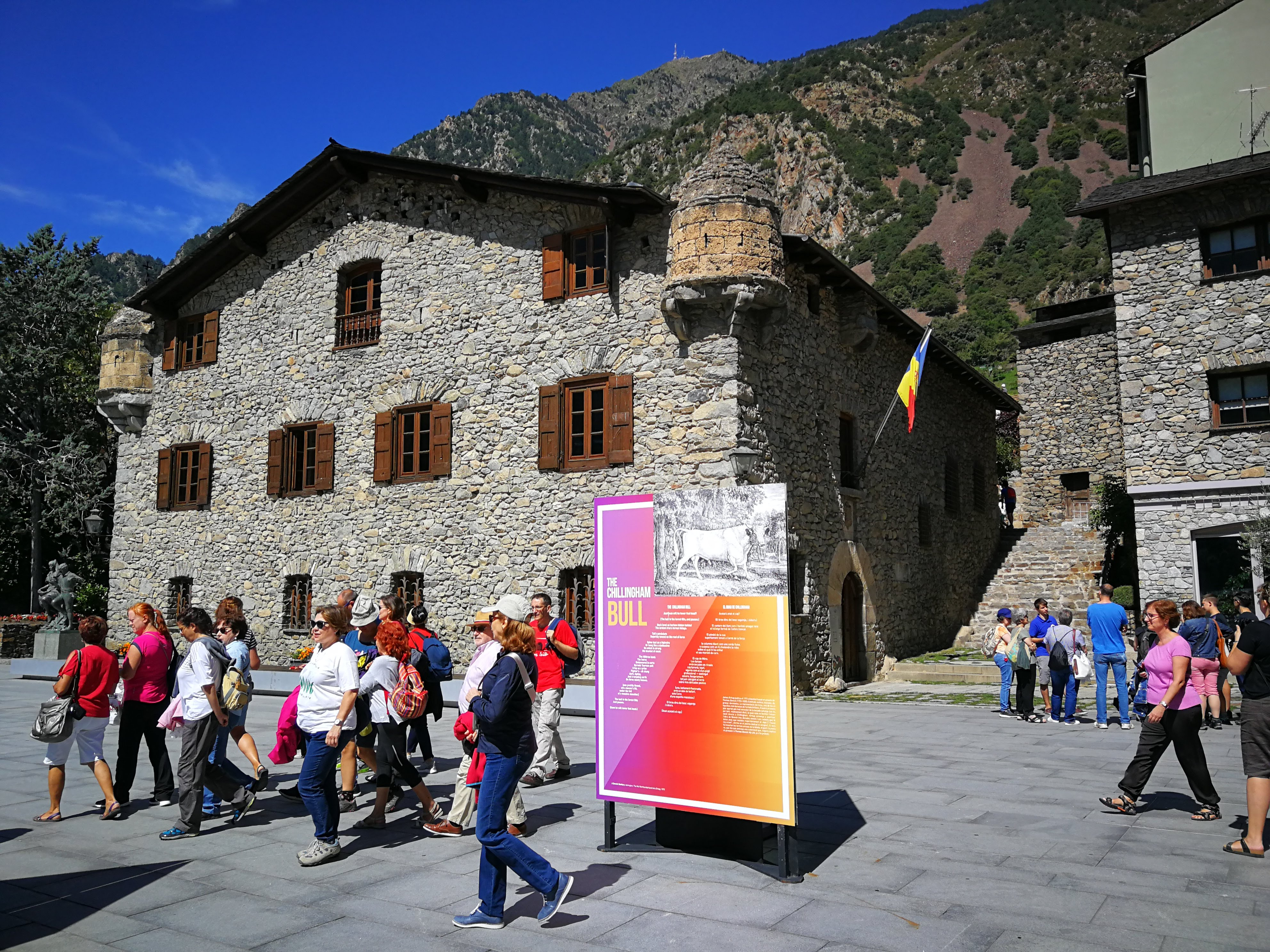
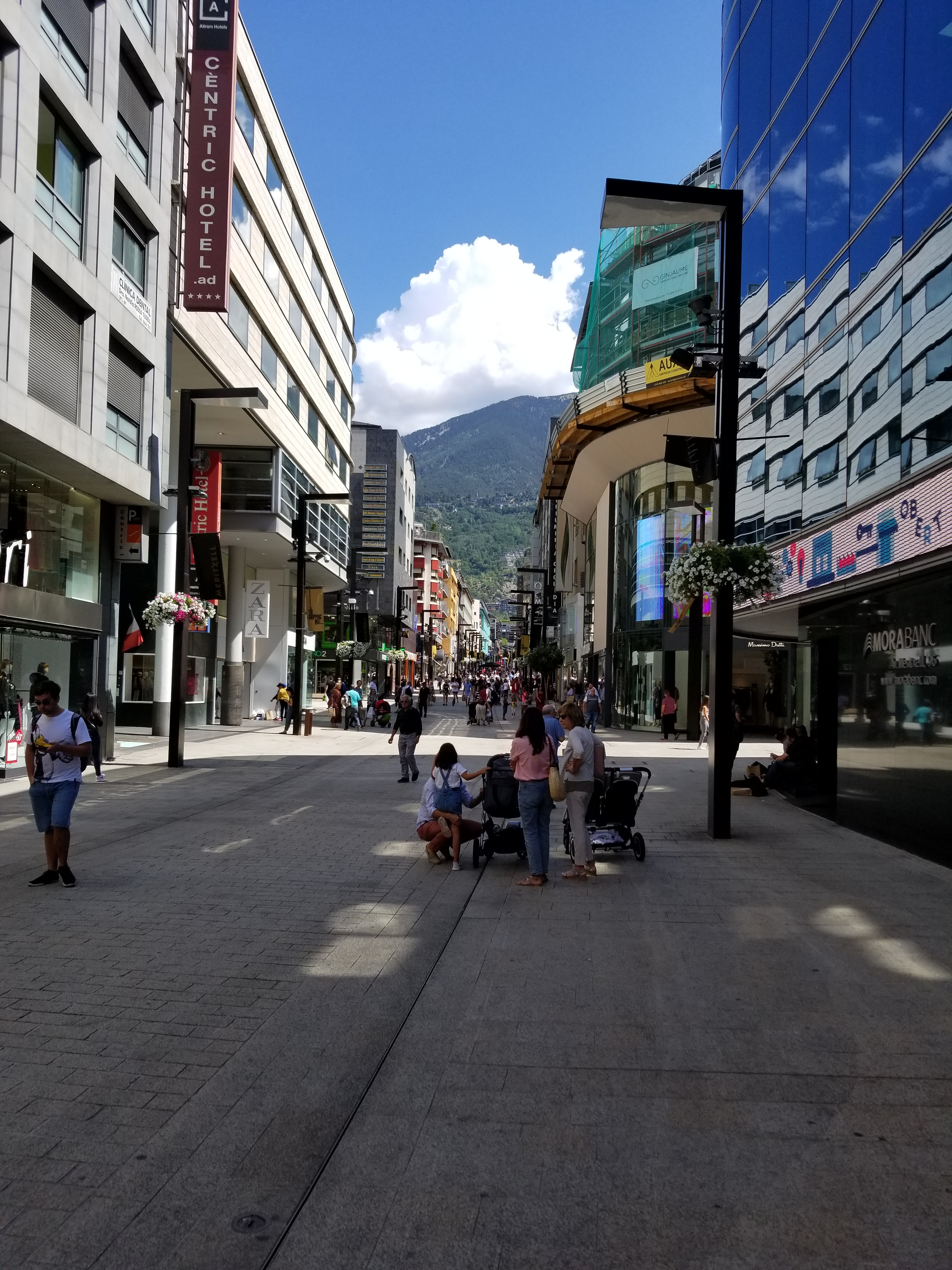
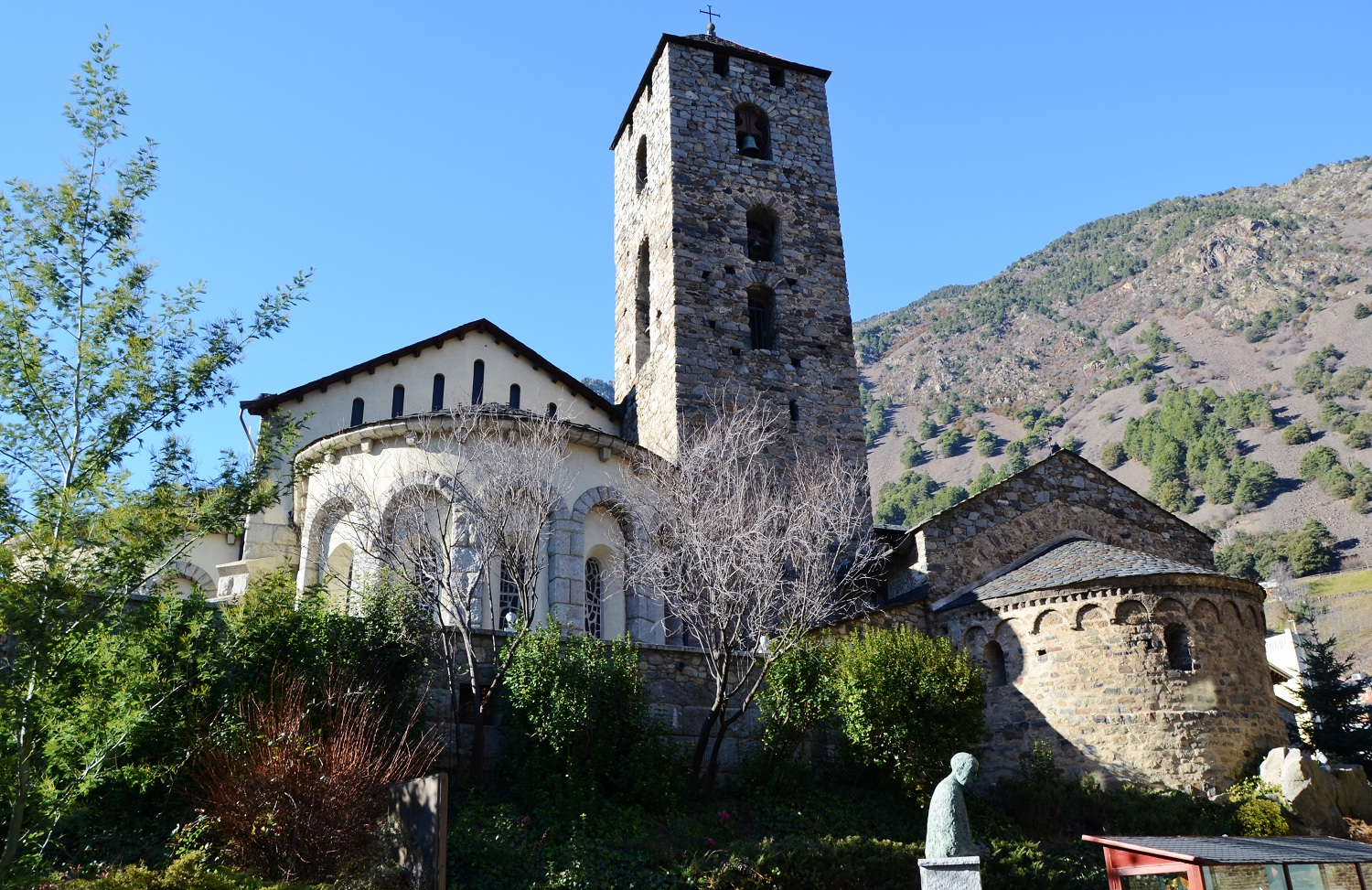
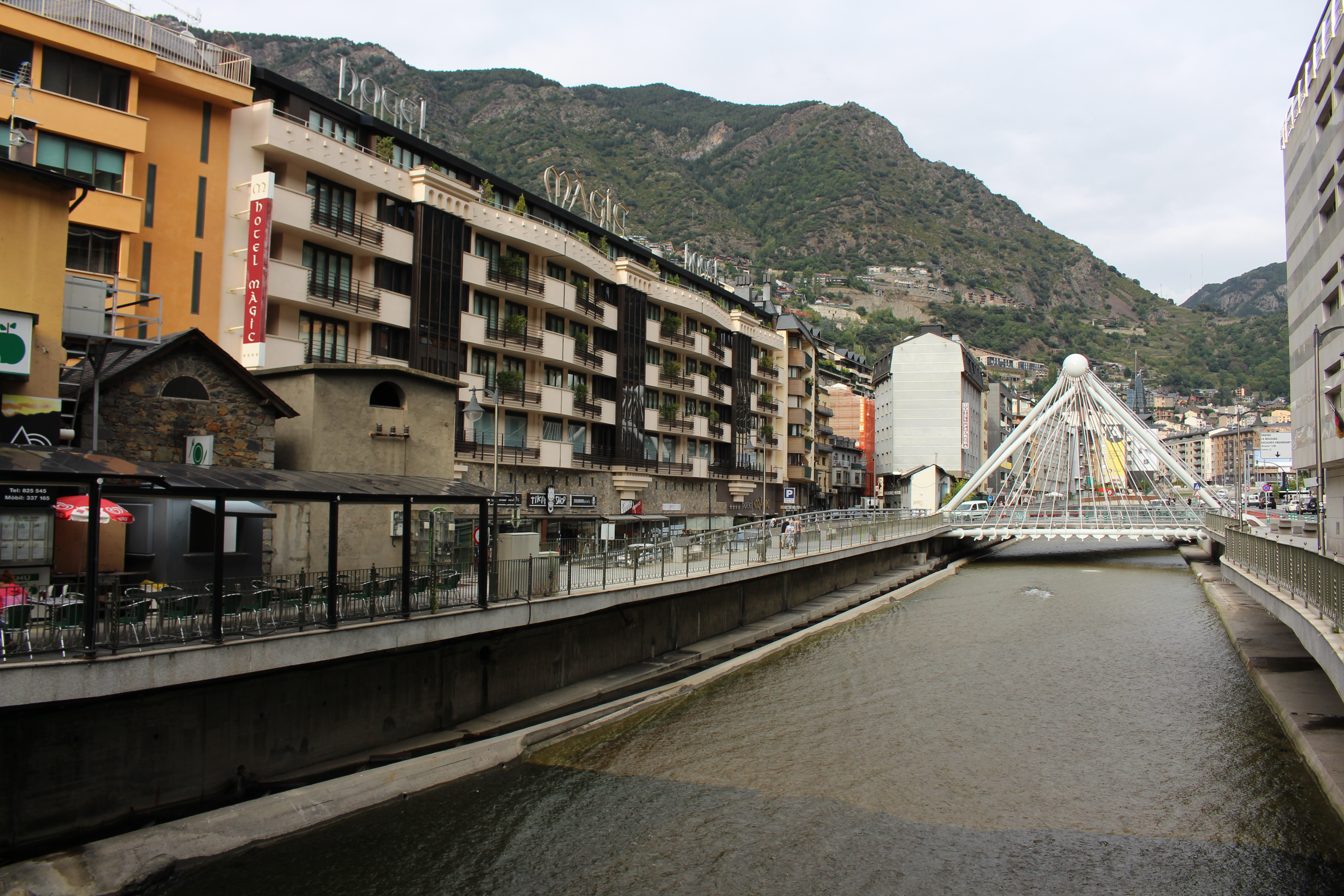
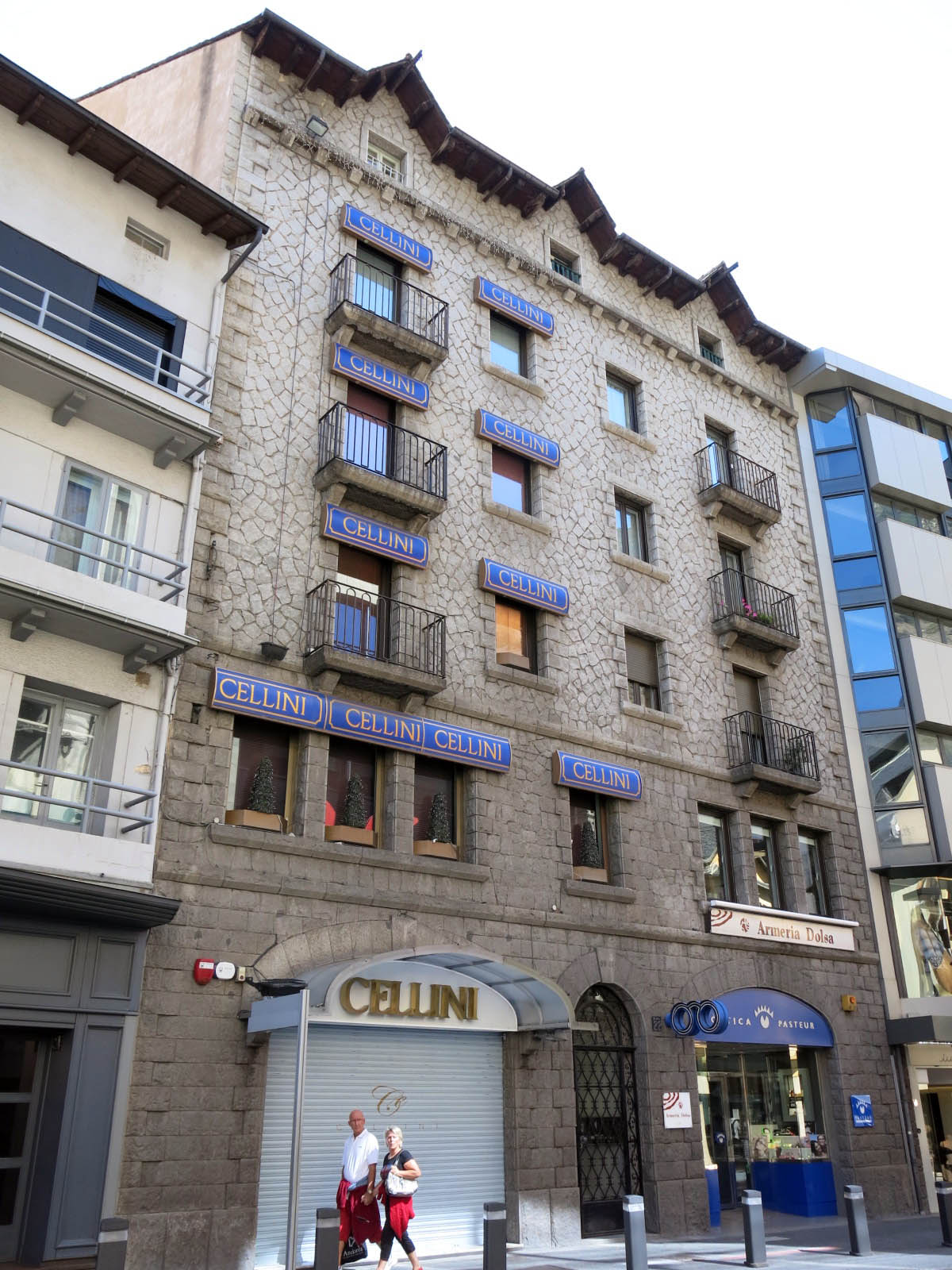
- View from a northern side Consell General d'Andorra Casa de la Vall Centric Hotel Church of Saint Stephen La Valira Massip-Dolsa house

- Flag Seal Coat of arms

- Location within Andorra

- Location in Andorra Location in Europe
- Coordinates: 42°30′22″N 01°31′18″E
- Country: Andorra
- Parishes: Andorra la Vella
- Villages: La Margineda, Santa Coloma

Government
  - Cònsol Major: Sergi González Camacho (PS)

Area
  - Total: 12 km^{2} (4.6 sq mi)
- Elevation: 1,023 m (3,356 ft)

Population (2011)
  - Total: 22,256
  - Rank: 1st
  - Density: 1,900/km^{2} (4,800/sq mi)
- Demonyms: Andorran andorrà, andorrana (ca)
- Time zone: UTC+01:00 (CET)
  - Summer (DST): UTC+02:00 (CEST)
- Postal code: AD500
- Website: andorralavella.ad

Andorra la Vella (Note: UK: /ænˌdɔːrə lə ˈveɪjə/ an-DOR-ə lə VAY-yə, US: /- lɑː ˈveɪljə/ - lah VAYL-yə Catalan: [ənˈdɔrə lə ˈβeʎə], locally [anˈdɔra la ˈβeʎa] Spanish: Andorra la Vieja [anˈdora la ˈβjexa] Occitan: Andòrra la Vièlha [anˈdɔrɔ la ˈβjɛʎɔ] French: Andorre-la-Vieille [ɑ̃dɔʁ la vjɛj]) is the capital and largest city of Andorra. It is located high in the east Pyrenees, between France and Spain. It is also the name of the Andorran parish that surrounds the capital.

As of 2023, the city had a population of 24,042, and the urban area, which includes Escaldes–Engordany plus satellite villages, has over 40,000 inhabitants.

The principal industry is tourism, and the country also earns foreign income from being a tax haven. It is at an elevation of 1,023 m (3,356 ft), and is the highest capital city in Europe. The city shares a border with Spain.

== Name ==
Andorra la Vella means "the city of Andorra", to distinguish it from the Principality of Andorra as a whole. Although in Catalan the word vella (like French vieille) is derived from the Latin word vetula which means "old", the Vella here (like French ville and Catalan vila) is derived from the Latin word villa, meaning "city".

== History ==
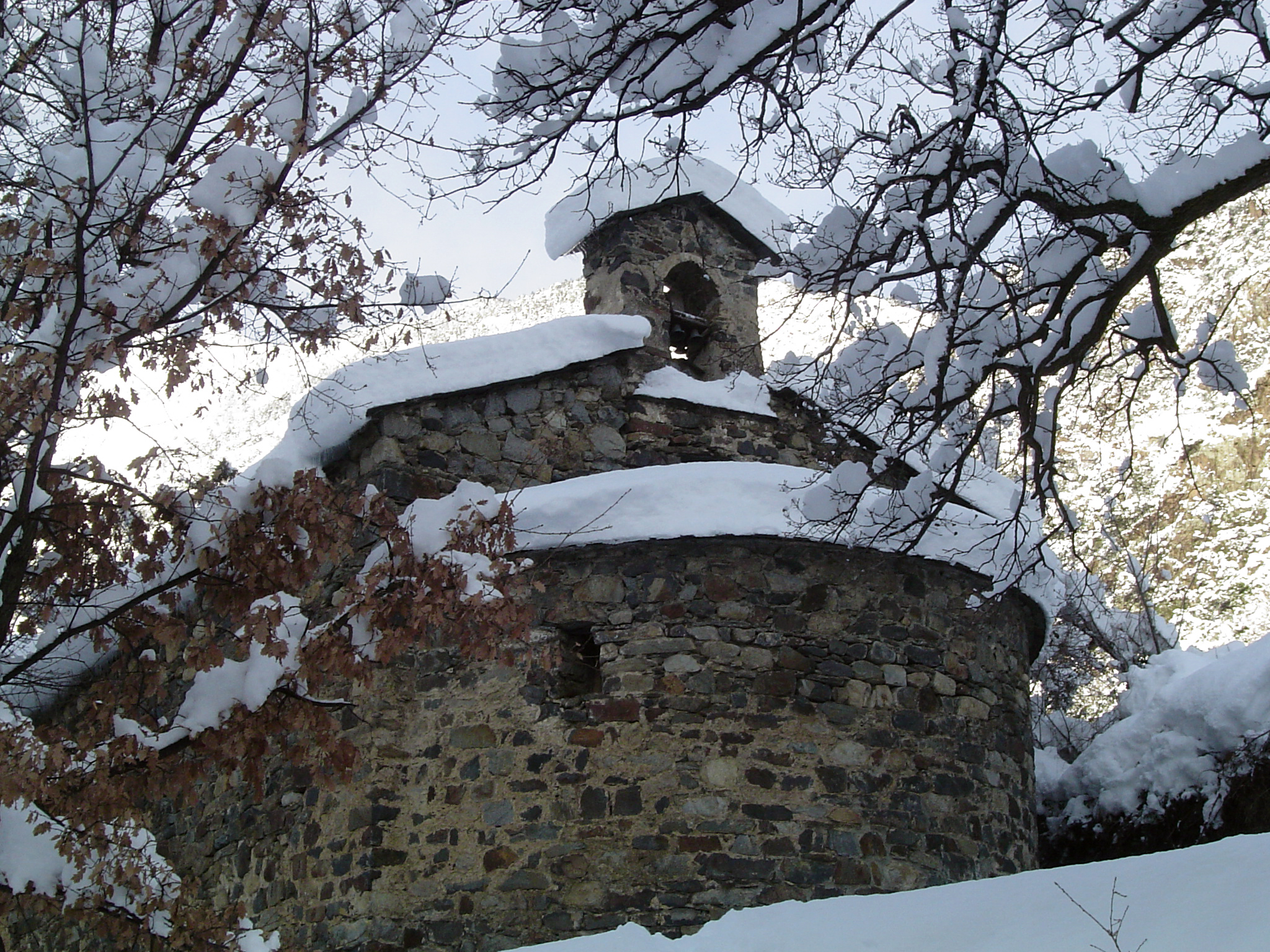
Sant Andreu Church

The site of Andorra la Vella has been settled since prior to the Christian era—notably by the Andosin tribe from the late Neolithic. Andorra was part of the County of Urgell, one of the Catalan counties of the Marca Hispanica created by Charlemagne in the eighth century as a buffer from the Moorish settlers in the Iberian Peninsula.

The settlement of Andorra la Vella has been the principal city of Andorra since 1278 when the French and the Episcopal co-princes agreed to joint suzerainty. Andorra la Vella's old town—the Barri Antic—includes streets and buildings dating from this time. Its most notable building is the Casa de la Vall—constructed in the early sixteenth century—which has been the state's parliamentary house since 1702. Andorra la Vella was, during this period, the capital of a largely isolated and feudal lordship within the Principality of Catalonia, which retained its existence due to this principle of co-sovereignty.

Well into the twentieth century, the area around Andorra la Vella remained largely forgotten. After political turmoil in the 1930s and an attempted coup by Boris Skossyreff, an informal democracy developed.

In 1993, the country's first constitution formalised this parliamentary democracy with executive, legislative, and judicial branches located in Andorra la Vella.

During this period, Andorra also developed as a tax haven, resulting in the construction of modern banking offices in Andorra La Vella. The city also developed its skiing facilities, to the extent that Andorra la Vella was Andorra's applicant city for the XXI Olympic Winter Games, the 2010 Winter Olympics. However, Andorra la Vella was not selected by the IOC as a candidate city, following the evaluation report of an IOC commission. It also hosted both the 1991 and 2005 Games of the Small States of Europe.

== Geography ==
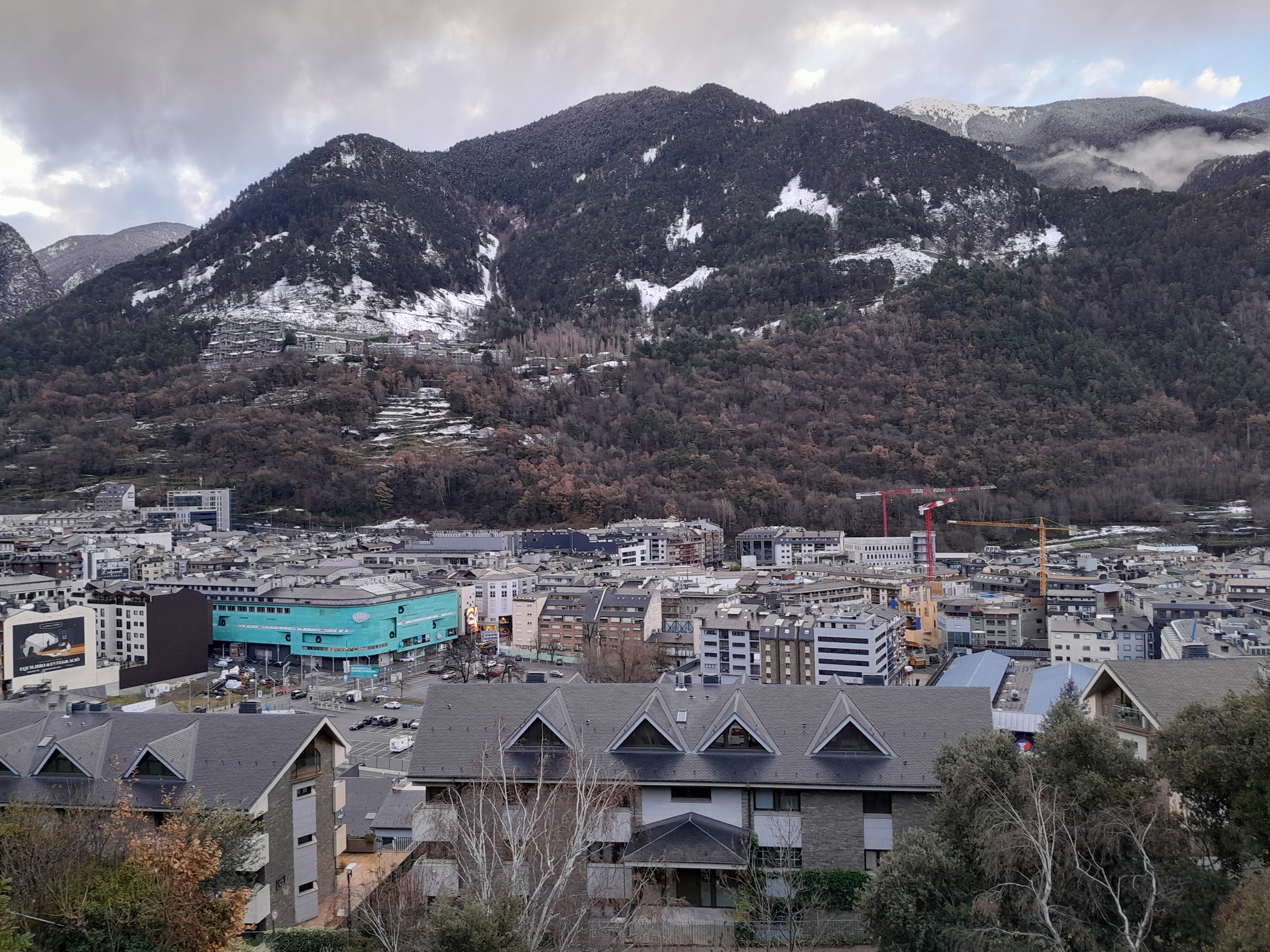
View of Andorra la Vella in winter

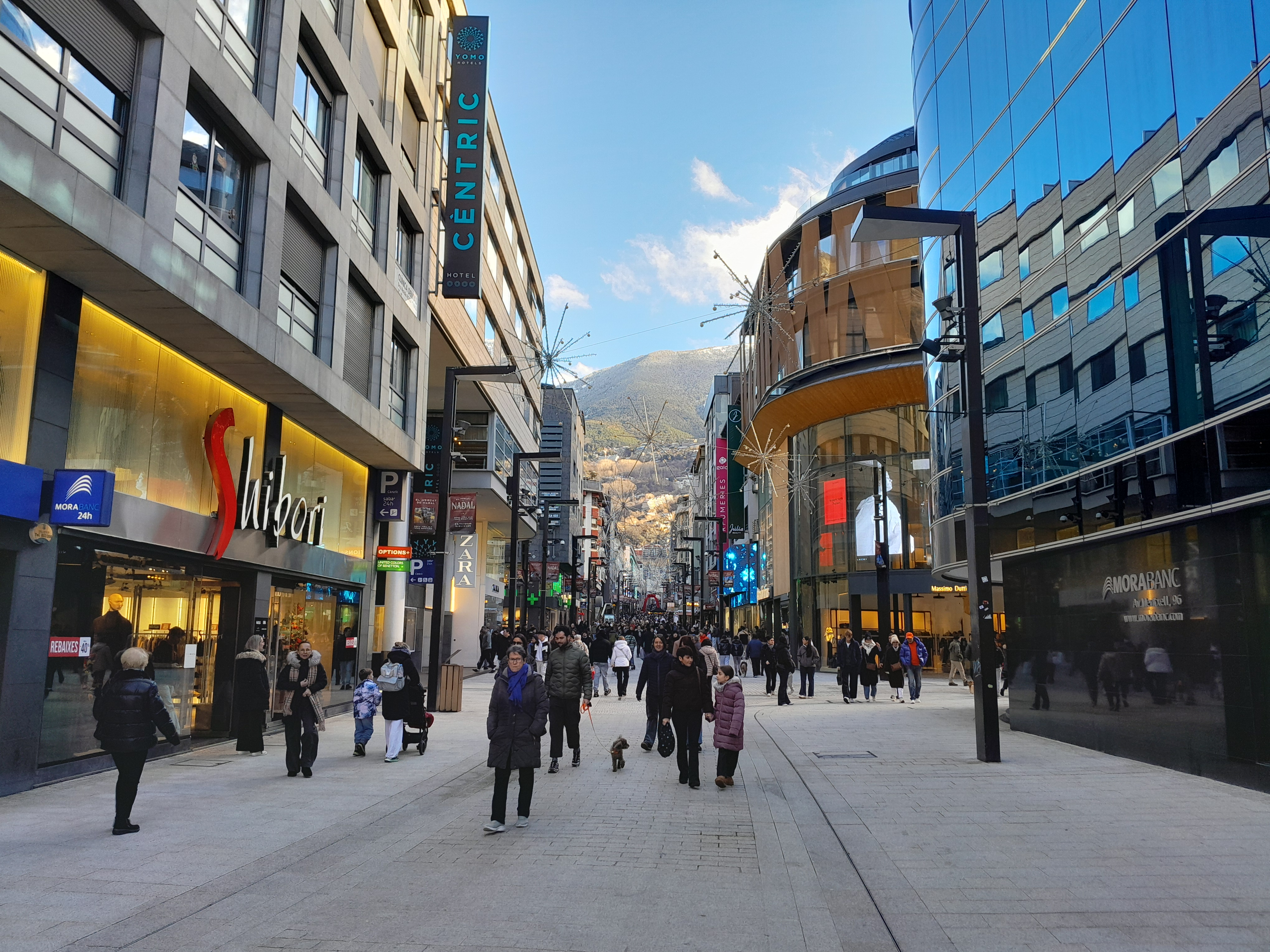
Main street

Andorra la Vella is located in the south west of Andorra, at 42°30′N 1°30′E, at the confluence of two mountain streams, the Valira del Nord (Northern Valira) and the Valira de l'Orient (Eastern Valira), which join to form the Gran Valira. It adjoins the urban area of Escaldes–Engordany. The city is at 1,023 metres (3,356 ft) above sea level.

=== Climate ===
Andorra la Vella has an oceanic climate (Köppen climate classification: Cfb), with warm days and cool nights in summer, and chilly to cold, snowy winters. The average annual precipitation is 812.3 mm (32 in). Temperatures in the city are lowered by the altitude (1,075 metres) compared with lowland areas.

Climate data for Andorra La Vella (Roc de Sant Pere), elevation: 1,075m (1971–2000, extremes 1934–present)
Month	Jan	Feb	Mar	Apr	May	Jun	Jul	Aug	Sep	Oct	Nov	Dec	Year
Record high °C (°F)	18.0 (64.4)	20.0 (68.0)	24.8 (76.6)	29.0 (84.2)	29.2 (84.6)	37.4 (99.3)	39.0 (102.2)	35.9 (96.6)	32.0 (89.6)	31.0 (87.8)	21.2 (70.2)	19.0 (66.2)	39.0 (102.2)
Mean daily maximum °C (°F)	6.9 (44.4)	8.9 (48.0)	11.7 (53.1)	13.3 (55.9)	17.6 (63.7)	21.9 (71.4)	26.2 (79.2)	25.4 (77.7)	21.4 (70.5)	16.0 (60.8)	10.7 (51.3)	7.5 (45.5)	15.6 (60.1)
Daily mean °C (°F)	2.2 (36.0)	3.5 (38.3)	5.8 (42.4)	7.5 (45.5)	11.5 (52.7)	15.4 (59.7)	18.8 (65.8)	18.5 (65.3)	14.9 (58.8)	10.3 (50.5)	5.7 (42.3)	3.0 (37.4)	9.8 (49.6)
Mean daily minimum °C (°F)	−2.5 (27.5)	−1.8 (28.8)	−0.2 (31.6)	1.7 (35.1)	5.3 (41.5)	8.8 (47.8)	11.4 (52.5)	11.4 (52.5)	8.5 (47.3)	4.7 (40.5)	0.6 (33.1)	−1.4 (29.5)	3.9 (39.0)
Record low °C (°F)	−15 (5)	−16 (3)	−11 (12)	−7 (19)	−2 (28)	0.0 (32.0)	3.0 (37.4)	2.0 (35.6)	0.0 (32.0)	−6 (21)	−13 (9)	−19.5 (−3.1)	−19.5 (−3.1)
Average precipitation mm (inches)	53.1 (2.09)	37.9 (1.49)	40.5 (1.59)	71.2 (2.80)	89.8 (3.54)	84.2 (3.31)	60.7 (2.39)	85.6 (3.37)	80.9 (3.19)	72.4 (2.85)	68.4 (2.69)	67.9 (2.67)	812.3 (31.98)
Source 1: ACDA
Source 2: Meteo Climat (record highs and lows)

=== Subdivisions ===
View of Andorra la Vella and Escaldes-Engordany

The parish of Andorra la Vella is divided into the villages of Andorra la Vella itself, La Margineda and Santa Coloma.

=== Landmarks ===
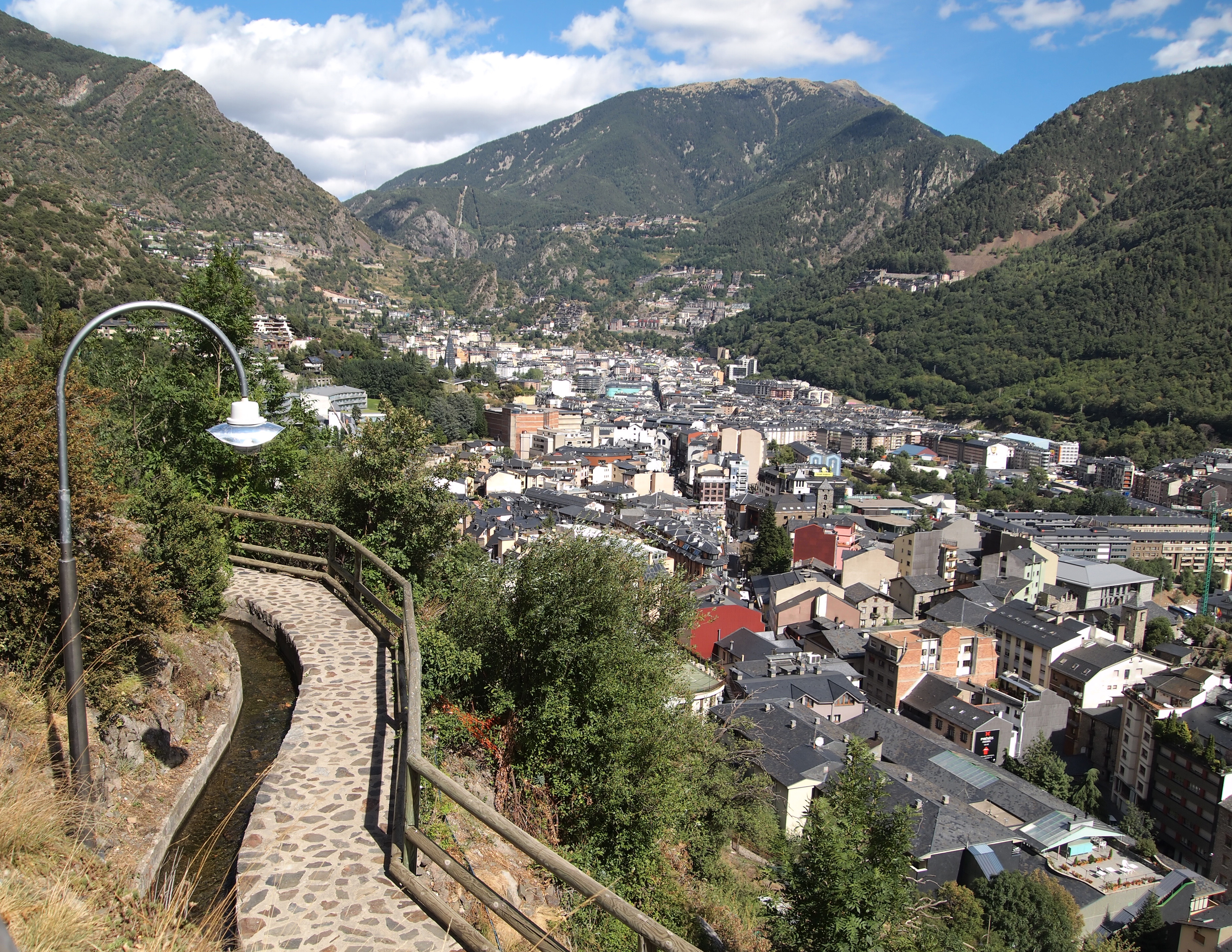
Footpath in Andorra la Vella

The city's old town is characterized by old stone streets and houses. The central Església de Sant Esteve (Saint Stephen) church is part of the area that guidebooks often label as a picturesque part of the city. This was built in a Romanesque style in the eleventh century. As mentioned earlier, the old town also includes the country's historic parliament building. Probably the oldest building in the city is another church, dating from the ninth century, the Church of Santa Coloma d'Andorra.

== Demographics ==
Largest groups of foreign residents
Nationality	Population (2013)
Spain	6,516
Portugal	3,377
France	664
Morocco	246
Philippines	218

Native Andorrans account for only a third (33.3%) of the population, with the plurality being Spaniards (43%), and notable minorities of Portuguese (11%) and French (7%). Most of the inhabitants are Roman Catholics. There is a high life expectancy of over 80 years.

== Culture ==
The city is the country's cultural centre, with the Government Exhibition Hall acting as a main theatre and museum. The piazza outside the parliament building is also the location of a number of events, and the town hosts a music festival every winter.

=== Languages ===
Catalan is the official language, although Spanish, Portuguese and French are also spoken.

== Notable people ==
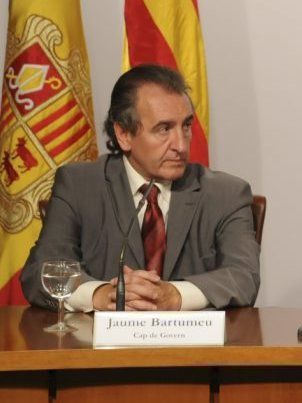
Jaume Bartumeu, 2009

- Elidà Amigó i Montanya (born 1935 and died 2020 in Andorra la Vella) historian and activist, a leader in Andorra's women's suffrage movement
- Marc Forné Molné (born 1946 in Andorra la Vella) was the Prime Minister of Andorra from 1994 to 2005
- Lluís Claret (born 1951 in Andorra la Vella), cellist, especially of chamber music
- Albert Salvadó (born 1951 in Andorra la Vella and died in 2020), writer and industrial engineer
- Jaume Bartumeu GCIH (born 1954) lawyer and politician, who served as head of government from 2009 to 2011
- Juli Minoves (born 1969 in Andorra la Vella) diplomat, author and the 13th President of Liberal International
- Pere López Agràs (born 1971 in Andorra la Vella) politician who served as an acting Prime Minister in 2011
- Vanessa Mendoza Cortés (born 1980 in Andorra la Vella) psychologist and activist who campaigns for the decriminalisation of abortion

=== Sport ===
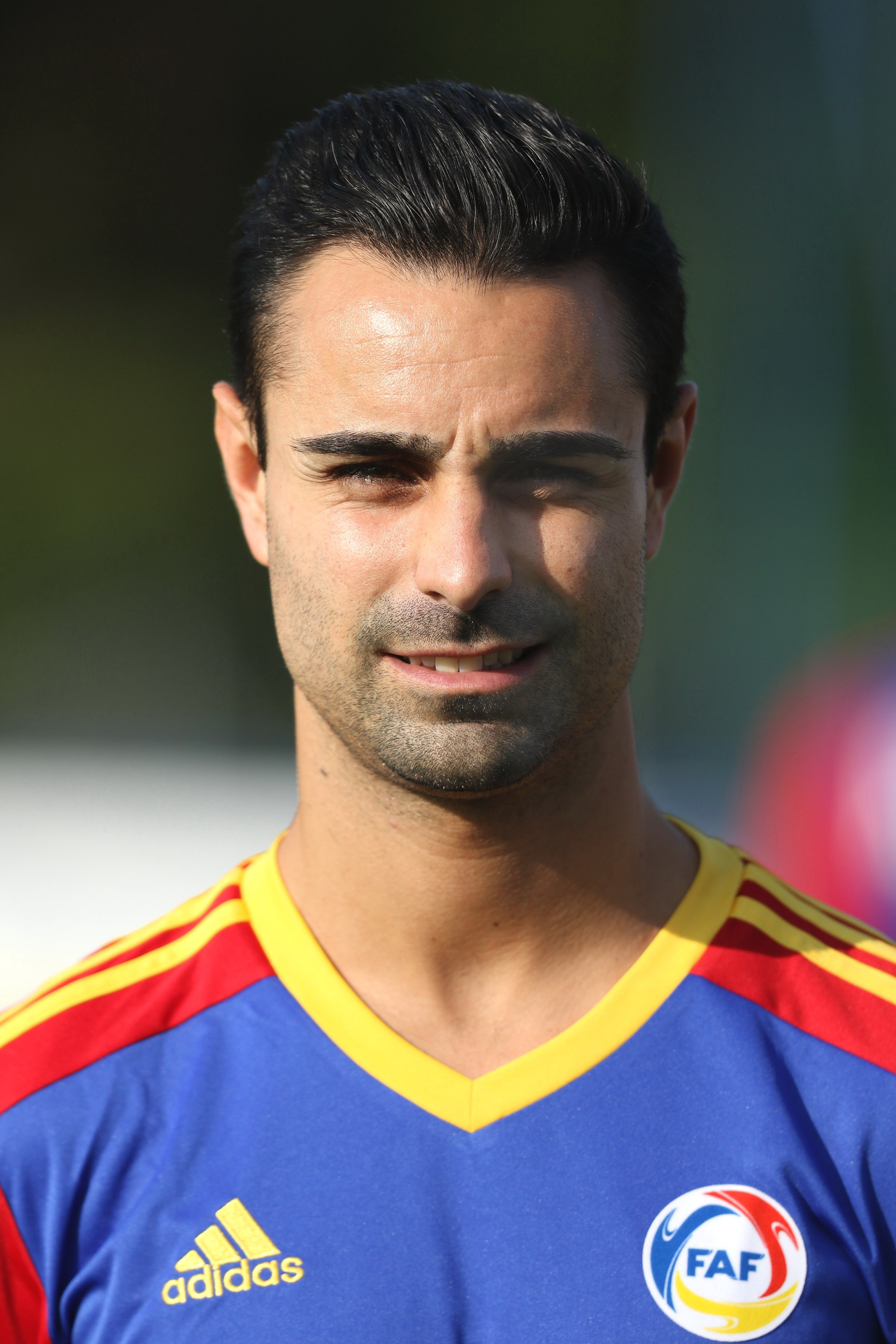
Marc García, 2016

- Javier Sánchez (born 1968 in Andorra la Vella) is a former professional tennis player, 1986 to 2000
- Sophie Dusautoir Bertrand (born 1972 in Andorra la Vella) ski mountaineer
- Toni Besolí (born 1976 in Andorra la Vella) judoka, who competed in the men's middleweight
- Marc Bernaus (born 1977 in Andorra la Vella) retired footballer who played as a left back.
- Santiago Deu (born 1980) former middle-distance freestyle swimmer, competed 2000 Summer Olympics in Sydney
- Meritxell Sabaté (born 1980 in Andorra la Vella) former long-distance freestyle swimmer, competed in the 1996 and 2000 Summer Olympics
- Marta Roure (born 1981 in Andorra la Vella) singer and actress
- Carolina Cerqueda (born 1985 in Andorra la Vella) former sprint freestyle swimmer, competed in the 2004 Summer Olympics
- Marc Garcia (born 1988 in Andorra la Vella), commonly known as Chiqui, is an Andorran footballer
- Xavier Cardelús (born 1998 in Andorra la Vella), is a motorcycle rider, who competes in 2022 MotoE World Cup

== Economy and infrastructure ==
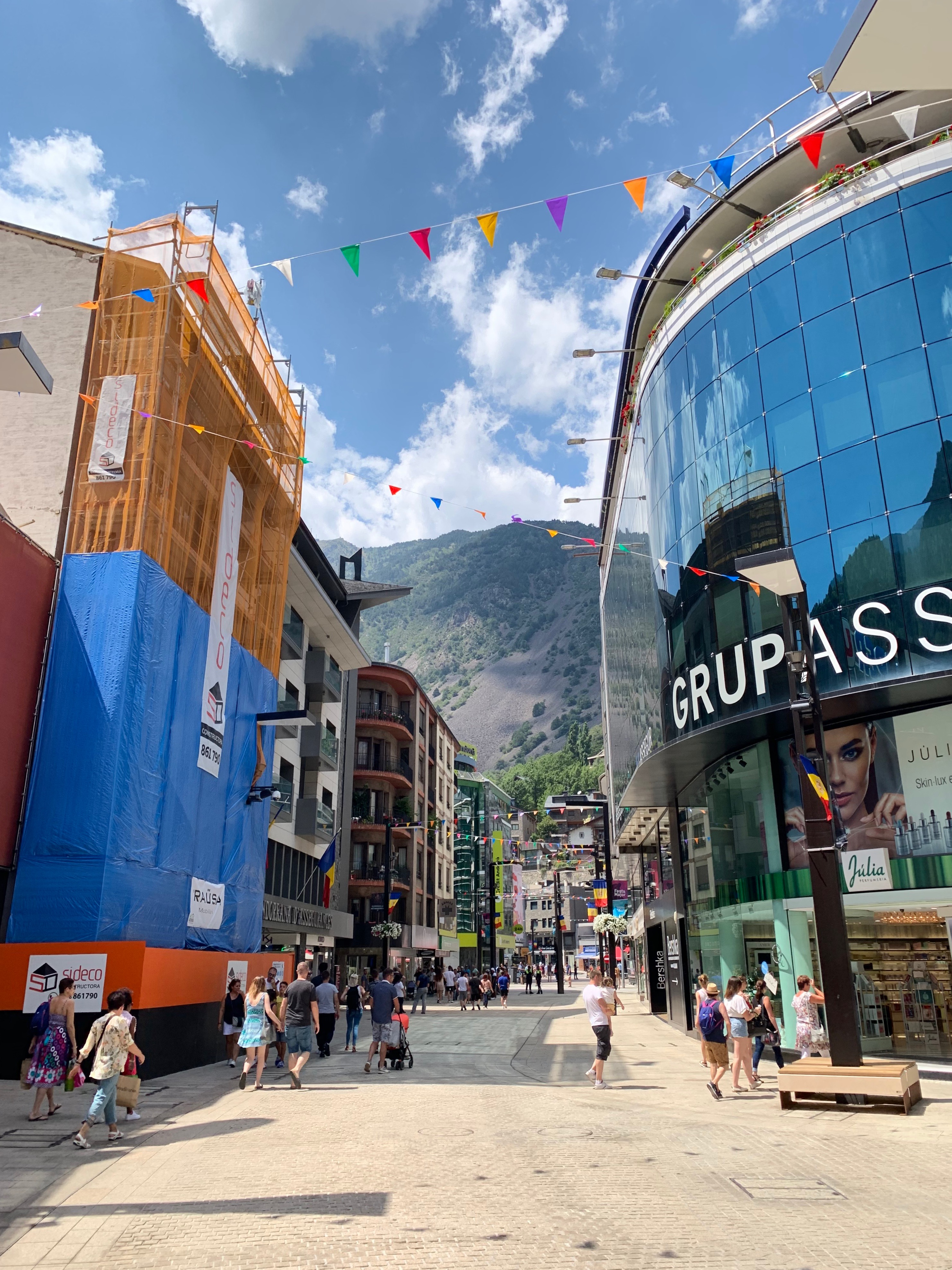
Central street in Andorra la Vella

Andorra la Vella is the country's commercial centre. In the country as a whole, 80% of the GDP is derived from the 10 million tourists who visit annually. The city is also the centre for the many banks and businesses that thrive from its tax haven status. The state is not a member of the European Union, but has a customs arrangement with the EU, and uses the euro.

=== Transportation ===
Andorra la Vella has direct access to air transportation with commercial helicopter flights from Andorra la Vella Heliport, located in the city centre. Andorra–La Seu d'Urgell Airport is located 24 kilometres (15 miles) south of the city; it is actually located in Spain and since July 2015 operates domestic routes to various airports across that country. Nearby airports located in Spain and France provide access to international flights with the nearest airports being Perpignan (156 km away) and Lleida (160 km away). The largest nearby airports are Toulouse (Tolosa), Girona and Barcelona.

Andorra la Vella does not have a train station, although there are bus shuttle services linking the city to train stations at L'Hospitalet-près-l'Andorre (France) and Lleida in Spain. There are also shuttle buses from Barcelona, Girona and Reus' airports to Andorra la Vella.

== Education ==
=== Schooling ===
Andorra la Vella has 11 schools available (10 public and 1 private), with the French system most deeply layered. The multisystem choice allows families to choose between Catalan-based, Spanish-based and French-based public schooling. Andorra la Vella has a complete educational pipeline, from early childhood to secondary, all available within the parish. All schools are built and maintained by Andorran authorities, but teachers in the French and Spanish schools are paid for the most part by France and Spain.

=== Public schools by system and age ===
==== Andorran Public System ====
- Escola andorrana Andorra la Vella (2–11 years old)
- Escola andorrana de Santa Coloma i del Roc (12–15 years old)
- Escola andorrana Andorra la Vella (16–17 years old)

==== Spanish Public System ====
- Instituto español María Moliner en La Margineda (12–17 years old)
- Colegio español Mare Janer en Santa Coloma (2–15 years old)
- Colegio español Sant Ermengol en Andorra la Vella (2–17 years old)
- Instituto Español de Andorra (IEA) (12–17 years old)

==== French Public System ====
- Ecole maternelle Française d'Andorre la Vieille (2–6 years old)
- École élémentaire Française d'Andorre la Vieille (6–10 years old)
- École primaire Française Santa Coloma (2–10 years old)
- Lycée Français Comte de Foix en Andorra la Vella (11–17 years old)

=== Private schools ===
- The British College of Andorra en Andorra la Vella (3–13 years old but is expanding)

=== Higher education ===
Andorra la Vella does not host higher education itself. The Universitat d'Andorra (UdA) is the state public university and is the only university in Andorra, situated in Sant Julià de Lòria (~7 km away).

== International relations ==
=== Twin towns – sister cities ===
Andorra la Vella is twinned with the following cities:

- Sant Pol de Mar, Spain
- Valls, Spain
- Foix, France
- Šid, Serbia

=== Union of Ibero-American Capital Cities ===
Andorra la Vella has been part of the Union of Ibero-American Capital Cities since 2008, establishing brotherly relations with the following cities:

- Asunción, Paraguay
- Barcelona, Spain
- Bogotá, Colombia
- Brasília, Brazil
- Buenos Aires, Argentina
- Cádiz, Spain
- Caracas, Venezuela
- Guatemala City, Guatemala
- Havana, Cuba
- Quito, Ecuador
- La Paz, Bolivia
- Lima, Peru
- Lisbon, Portugal
- Madrid, Spain
- Managua, Nicaragua
- Mexico City, Mexico
- Montevideo, Uruguay
- Panama City, Panama
- Port-au-Prince, Haiti
- Rio de Janeiro, Brazil
- San José, Costa Rica
- San Juan, Puerto Rico
- San Salvador, El Salvador
- Santiago, Chile
- Santo Domingo, Dominican Republic
- São Paulo, Brazil
- Sucre, Bolivia
- Tegucigalpa, Honduras
