= List of intelligence agencies of France =

This is a list of current and former French intelligence agencies.

== Currently active ==
Organization chart given on a website of French intelligence community

- DGSE: Directorate-General for External Security – Direction générale de la sécurité extérieure. It is the military foreign intelligence agency, which succeeded the Service de Documentation Extérieure et de Contre-Espionnage (SDECE) in 1982 (itself preceded by the Direction Générale des Études et Recherches (DGER), dependent on the BCRA.
- DGSI: General Directorate for Internal Security – Direction générale de la sécurité intérieure. Founded in 2008 by the merger of the RG and the DST, it is tasked with counter-espionage, counter-terrorism and the surveillance of potential threats on French territory.
- DRM: Directorate of Military Intelligence – Direction du renseignement militaire. It was created by Interior Minister Pierre Joxe in 1992, after the Gulf War, to centralize military intelligence information.
- TRACFIN : Intelligence Processing and Action Against Clandestine Financial Circuits - Tracfin. Founded in 1990, it is tasked with tackling money laundering and the financing of terrorism.
- DRSD: Directorate of Intelligence and Security of Defense – Direction du renseignement et de la sécurité de la Défense. It is a military intelligence agency, charged with conducting counter-espionage.
- BRGE: Intelligence and Electronic Warfare Brigade – Brigade de renseignement.
- DCPJ: Judicial Police – Direction centrale de la police judiciaire.
- CNCTR: National Commission for the Control of Security Interceptions – Commission nationale de contrôle des techniques de renseignement.
- SCRT: Central Service of Territorial Surveillance - Service central de surveillance du territoire
- SNRP: Service national du renseignement pénitentiaire, a French intelligence agency for carceral security (riot prevention, surveillance of radicalized prisoners for avoid others radicalization, etc.

== Former agencies ==
- Bureau Central de Renseignements et d'Action (BCRA) was an intelligence agency created during World War II in 1940.
- Cabinet noir More formally, the cabinet du secret des postes. c. 1750.
- Deuxième Bureau: France's external military intelligence agency from 1871 to 1940. It was dissolved together with the Third Republic upon the armistice with Germany.
- DST: Directorate of Territorial Security – Direction de la surveillance du territoire. It was an intelligence agency of the Minister of Interior, charged with conducting counter-espionage (in particular in economic matters), and, since the end of the Cold War, also with counterterrorism issues. It was abolished in 2008 and merged into the DCRI.
- RG: General Intelligence Directorate – Direction centrale des renseignements généraux. It was the intelligence agency of the French police, directed by the Minister of the Interior. It was charged with monitoring gambling activities, criminal activities, and political radicals (far right and far left). It also used to have as a mission to monitor French political parties, but officially is not charged with this anymore. It was merged into the Direction centrale du renseignement intérieur in 2008.
- Service de documentation extérieure et de contre-espionnage (SDECE), successor to BCRA.

== See also ==
- History of espionage
- List of (worldwide) intelligence agencies
- Club de Berne
