= Department for Protection and Security =

Security branch of the National Rally

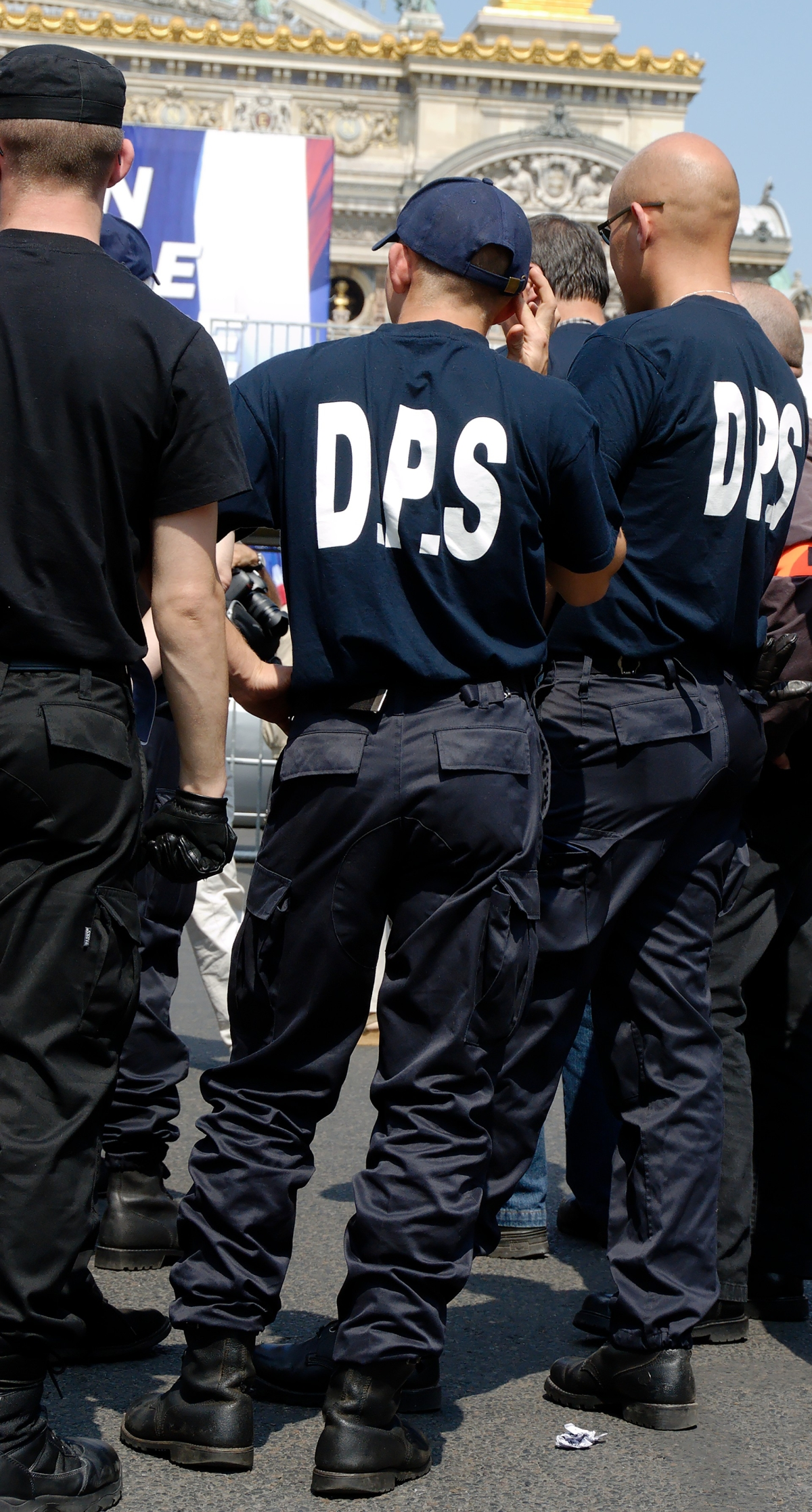
Members of the DPS at the National Rally party's annual tribute to Joan of Arc in Paris, 1 May 2007.

The Department for Protection and Security (DPS) (French: Département Protection et Sécurité) is the security branch of the National Rally (RN) political party of France (formerly the "National Front"), which depends directly on the RN's president and is led by Eric Staelens as of 2007. As of 2007, it consists of 1,500 members.

== Mission ==
The mission of the DPS is providing physical protection of the leaders of National Rally and the monitoring of events or meetings of the party. One feature of DPS compared to other political parties' security services is its quasi-military character, both in the origin of many of its members (former military, police or security guards) and in its equipment consisting of helmets and uniforms similar to those worn by the mobile brigades of law enforcement. There is a fairly strong tradition of red berets (Paratroops) and Green Berets (Foreign Legion). In 2022, the DPS changed their military style to a more formal one with suits, but still maintaining their mission of protecting party leaders, especially Le Pen.

== 1998 Parliamentary Commission on the acts of the DPS ==
In 1998, a Parliamentary Commission, led by Socialist MP Bernard Grasset (Green MP Noël Mamère and conservative MP Patrick Devedjian were also part of it), was created to investigate its acts, after several violent incidents during demonstrations and other occasions. The report was published on 3 June 1999, and pinpointed several cases of DPS member checking identity card of demonstrators instead of the police. It also pinpointed links with the Groupe Union Défense (GUD), former OAS members, mercenaries and private military contractors. The Parliamentary commission declared that the DPS should have been dissolved end of 1996, after the Montceau-les-Mines affair on 25 October 1996, when a DPS unit acted like an ordinary police order force, alike to the C.R.S. anti-riot units. After the creation of the Mouvement National Républicain (MNR) by Bruno Mégret, an offshoot from the RN, the DPS itself also split into two organizations, the DPS on one side and the DPA (Département Protection Assistance) on the other side.

A former member of the DPS has given a long interview to daily Libération. Using the pseudonym "Dominique", he explained that the DPS has special "unofficial" intervention squads made up of former paratroopers and Foreign Legionnaires, veterans of French interventions in Chad, Lebanon, and the Central African Republic. Some members of the DPS were present in covert operations in Zaire (1997 and 2001), Madagascar (in 2002, Didier Ratsiraka called for some mercenaries to resolve the political crisis), Ivory Coast (2001–2003).

== Bernard Courcelle's leadership until Bruno Mégret's scission ==
DPS is equipped with helmets and shields, gas masks, tear gas launchers, guns that fire rubber bullets, bulletproof vests, clubs, and gloves with lead weights. DPS is alleged to have compiled computerized lists of journalists and anti-fascist activists with their names, addresses, and photos. They engage in punitive actions against their opponents but have, Dominique said, excellent relations with the police, including the police commissioners. They are organized in terms of military ranks such as colonel and captain. According to Liberation, the DPS now has 3,000 members. Since 1993, the group has been commanded by Bernard Courcelle, who claims, "We only defend ourselves. We never attack the meetings of other groups." According to Reporters Sans Frontières, the DPS has records on journalists who follow the National Rally's activities and, on several occasions, was responsible for the beating up of reporters. After Bruno Mégret's split, Bernard Courcelle followed him with 1,700 members from the DPS, and Jean-Marie Le Pen named Marc Bellier to fill his place, and then Jean-Pierre Chabrut

In 1980, Bernard Courcelle was a member, along with Bruno Gollnisch, of the Direction de la Protection de la Sécurité et de la Défense (DPSD), an official Ministry of Defence organization in charge of recruiting mercenaries and informing on weapons traffic. The DPSD allegedly has or had ties, between the two wars, with the terrorist group La Cagoule. In 1983, Bernard Courcelle allegedly created a mercenary firm with his brother. The next year, he became the former security director of the French armaments manufacturer, Luchaire. In 1989, he was in charge of security for the Musée d'Orsay, which responsibility was assumed by none other than Anne Pingeot, president François Mitterrand's secret mistress. In 1993, Courcelle became the leader of the DPS, before becoming in 1999 the leader of Republic of the Congo's president Denis Sassou-Nguesso's personal guard. He then took charge of the security of the oil company Elf's infrastructures in Pointe-Noire.

== See also ==
- Service d'Action Civique
- Groupe Union Défense
