= Patrick Calvar =

French civil servant (born 1955)

Director-General for Internal Security (Note: The General Directorate for Internal Security was known as the Central Directorate for Interior Intelligence until 12 May 2014.)
- In office 31 May 2012 – 1 June 2017
- Preceded by: Bernard Squarcini
- Succeeded by: Laurent Nuñez

Personal details
- Born: Patrick Louis Calvar; 26 November 1955 (age 70) Antsirabe, French Madagascar

Patrick Louis Calvar (French pronunciation: [patʁik kalvaʁ]; born 26 November 1955) is a French retired police officer and civil servant who served as head of the General Directorate for Internal Security (DGSI) from 2012 to 2017.

== Career ==
Calvar spent over 30 years in the French security and intelligence services, starting his career during the Cold War. He joined the police in 1977 and the security service in 1984. He has worked at all levels of responsibility and was eventually appointed deputy director of the Direction de la surveillance du territoire (DST) in 2007.

In December 2009, he became director of intelligence of the foreign intelligence service, the General Directorate for External Security (DGSE). In May 2012, he was appointed director-general of the French internal security service, the General Directorate for Internal Security (DCRI then DGSI). In that capacity he faced the January 2015 Charlie Hebdo shooting, the November 2015 Paris attacks, and the 2016 Nice truck attack. In a testimony in front of the Senate Committee on Foreign Affairs, National Defence and the Armed Forces on 17 February 2016, Calvar stated about Islamic terrorists to have observed them going back to the "state of animals". He retired from the civil service in June 2017.

Currently Calvar is the head of C. Conseil, a strategic intelligence consulting company. He also teaches at Sciences Po and is a special advisor at the Institut Montaigne think tank.

== Honours ==
- Officer of the Legion of Honour (2016)
- Officer of the Ordre national du Mérite (2015)
