= Bernard Squarcini =

French intelligence official

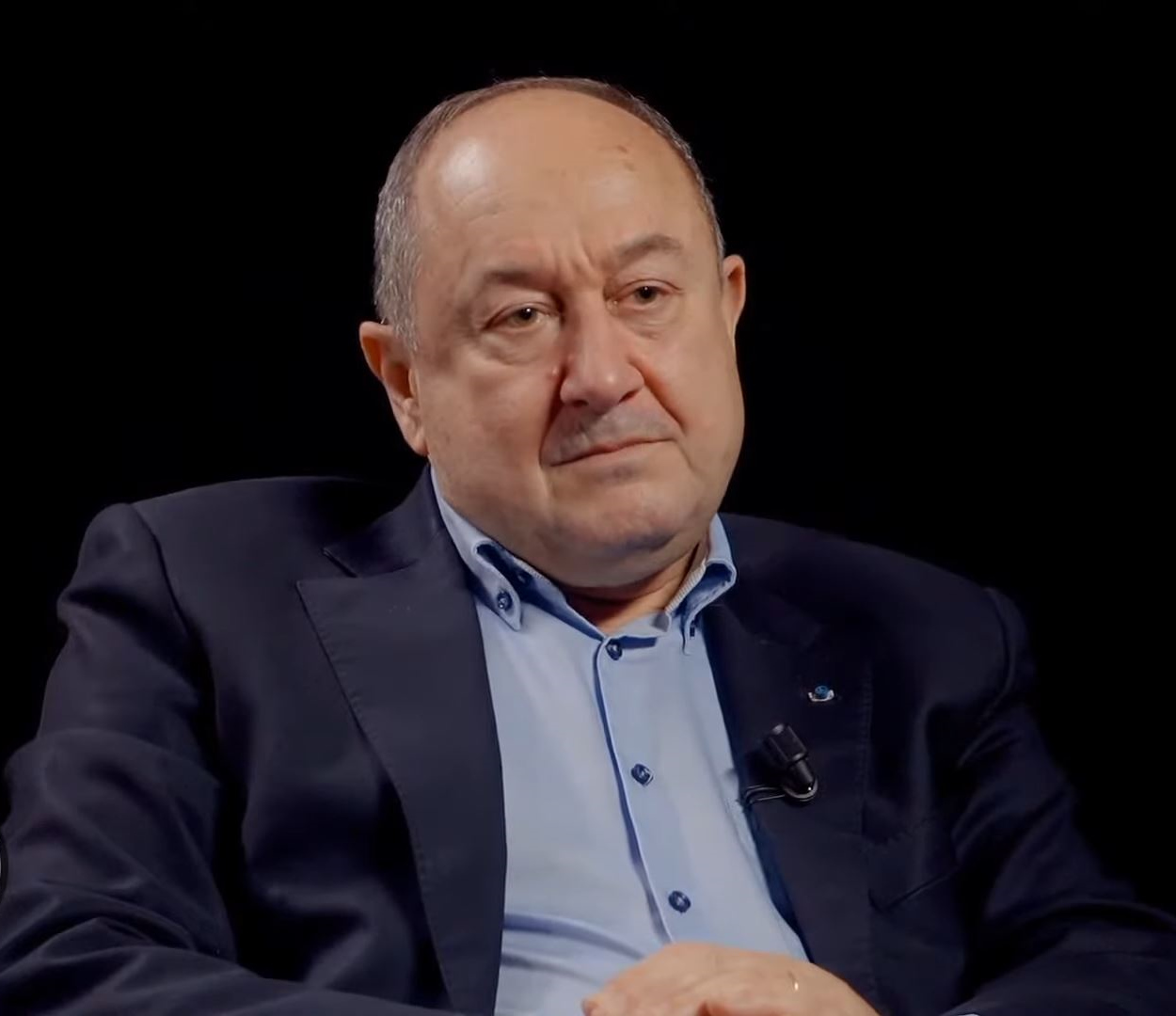
- Born: 12 December 1955 (age 70); Rabat, Morocco
- Education: Aix-Marseille University
- Occupation: Civil servant
- Known for: Head of the General Directorate for Internal Security (2008–2012)

Bernard Squarcini is a French intelligence official and security consultant. He was born on 12 December 1955 in Rabat, Morocco. He was the youngest Inspector General of Police.

Bernard Squarcini was head of the French Direction Centrale du Renseignement Intérieur (English: General Directorate for Internal Security) from 2 July 2008 to 30 May 2012. He was in charge of counterterrorism intelligence in Corsica, Basque Country and against Islamic extremism. In 2012 he created his company Kyrnos Conseil where he acts as an independent consultant.

== Early life ==
Bernard Squarcini holds a Master of law and a diploma in criminology.

== Career ==
In 1983, he was an aide to the regional director of General Intelligence in Corsica.

In 1988, he was the General Intelligence departmental director for the Pyrénées-Atlantiques region.

In 1989, he became head of the investigations and research division of the Direction centrale des renseignements généraux (DCRG; English: Central Directorate of General Intelligence). In 1993, he was appointed deputy director of Research at DCRG and the position of Deputy Central Director of General Intelligence in 1994 under the management of Yves Bertrand.

=== Yvan Colonna ===
Squarcini was instrumental in the 2003 arrest of Yvan Colonna, the alleged murderer of prefect Claude Érignac.

In February 2004 he was appointed deputy prefect for security and defence in the Provence-Alpes-Côte d'Azur region.

=== Intelligence and counterterrorism ===
On 27 June 2007, the Council of Ministers appointed Bernard Squarcini head of the Direction de la surveillance du territoire (DST; English: Directorate of Territorial Surveillance) in replacement of Pierre de Bousquet de Florian.

On 1 July 2008 the DST and the DCRG merged, becoming the Direction Centrale du Renseignement Intérieur (DCRI; English: General Directorate for Internal Security). Bernard Squarcini assumed its leadership on 2 July 2008.

On 30 May 2012 he was replaced by his former deputy, Patrick Calvar, and became prefect.

He left the police force on 28 February 2013 and created his company Kyrnos Conseil. In June 2013 he became Senior Advisor to the Chairman at Arcanum Global, a global strategic intelligence company and a subsidiary of Magellan Investment Holdings, of which M. Ron Wahid is the Chairman.

Established 23 March 2015, Magellan Investment Holdings is a holding company with investments in financial services, energy and natural resources, defense, technology and real estate. Magellan is the parent company of two subsidiaries: Arcanum, a global intelligence firm, and RJI Capital, a corporate finance and strategic advisory company.

In 2015, Squarcini was President of Arcanum France, the company’s European branch.

In November 2013, Squarcini published Renseignements français : nouveaux enjeux along with Etienne Pellot, in which he described his vision for a reform of the French intelligence services and a law to structure the intelligence activity, as well as measures to fight against Islamic extremism.

== Criminal conviction ==
In December 2021, French firm LVMH paid €10m to settle several criminal investigations into Bernard Squarcini's spying for the company, on competitors and on others including an activist making a movie about its billionaire owner, Bernard Arnault. Prosecutors allege that the former intelligence chief used tactics like influence peddling and invasion of privacy, leveraging his network in intelligence and police on behalf of the company. Squarcini was judged in November 2024, with the prosecutor requesting a 4 years suspended jail sentence and 5 years of professional disqualification. He was convicted in March 2025 and sentenced to two years of house arrest with electronic monitoring, along with a two-year suspended sentence and a €200,000 fine.

== Awards ==
- Knight of the Order of the Legion of Honour (France)
- Commander of the National Order of Merit (France)
- Grand Cross of Civil Merit (Spain)
- Silver Medal of Merit of the Guardia Civil (Spain)
- Police Cross of Merit (Spain)
- Grand Cross of Isabel the Catholic (Spain)
- Grand Officer of the Italian Order of Merit (Italy)

== Books ==
- Squarcini, Bernard; Pellot, Étienne (15 November 2013). Renseignement français: nouveaux enjeux. Ellipses Marketing. ISBN 978-2-7298-8338-6.
