= Pascal Mailhos =

French civil servant (born 1958)

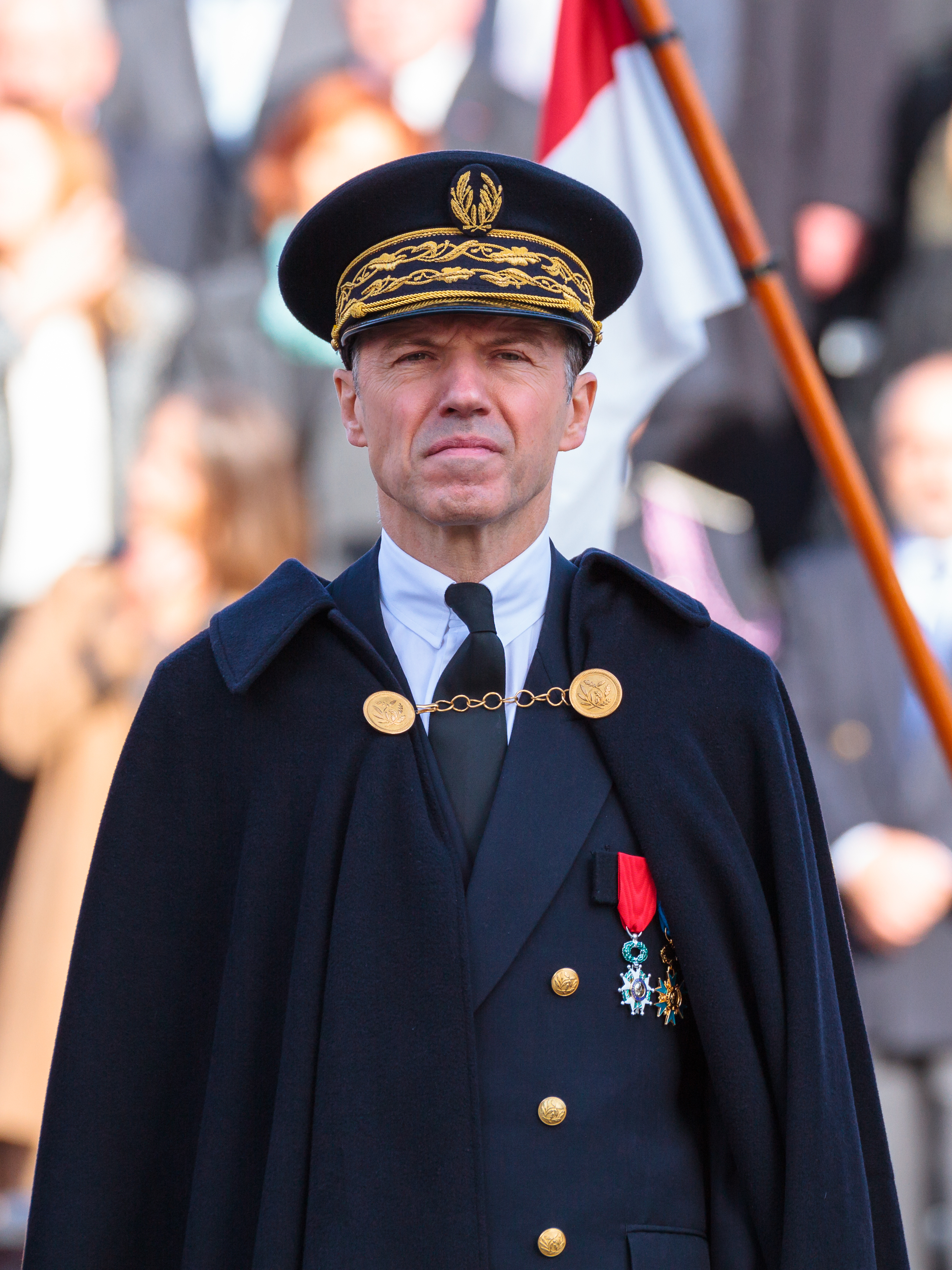
- Mailhos in 2014

Coordinator of the National Centre for Counter Terrorism
- Incumbent
- Assumed office 11 January 2023
- Preceded by: Laurent Nuñez

Personal details
- Born: 5 December 1958 (age 67)
- Parent: Georges Mailhos (father)

Pascal Pierre Mailhos (born 5 December 1958) is a French civil servant who has been serving as coordinator of the National Centre for Counter Terrorism since 2023. From 2018 to 2023, he served as prefect of Auvergne-Rhône-Alpes. From 2016 to 2018, he served as prefect of Occitania. From 2014 to 2015, he served as prefect of Midi-Pyrénées. From 2011 to 2014, he served as prefect of Burgundy. From 2008 to 2011, he served as prefect of Finistère. From 2004 to 2006, he served as director of the Direction centrale des renseignements généraux.
