= Hubac =

Hubac is a French surname. Hubač (feminine: Hubačová) is a Czech surname. Notable people with the surname include:

- Sylvie Hubac (born 1956), French political advisor
- Zbyněk Hubač (born 1940), Czech ski jumper
