= Éric Bucquet =

French military officer

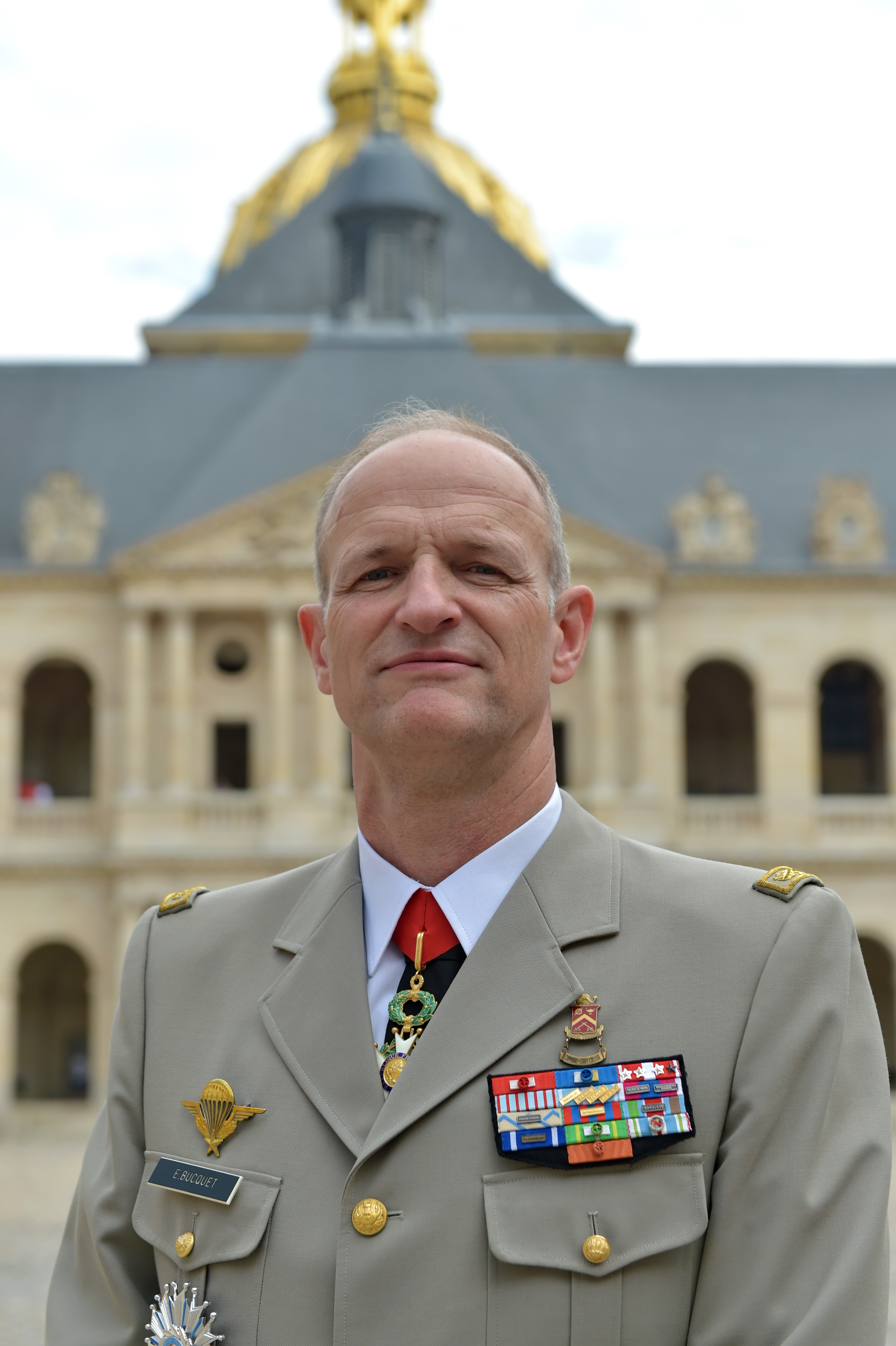
Éric Bucquet

Éric Bucquet (born December 12, 1962, in Paris, France) is a French Military Officer. Lieutenant general, he was Director of Defense Intelligence and Security from 2018 to 2022.

== Biography ==
In 1989, he moved to the Horn of Africa as AMX 13T 90 mm gun platoon leader with the 5th Overseas Interarms Regiment in Djibouti.

In 1999, he joined the École de Guerre before being transferred to the US to attend the US Marine Corps Command and Staff College in Quantico and the US Armed Forces Staff College in Norfolk from 1999 to 2000.

Promoted to colonel in 2004, he was commanding officer of the 5th Overseas Interarms Regiment from 2005 to 2007. He was assigned to the French Army Staff (EMAT) from 2007 to 2009.

Selected to attend CHEM and IHEDN, on July 15, 2009, he was appointed Deputy Chief of Staff to the President of the Republic. He was promoted to General Officer on June 1, 2011. On September 1, 2012, he was appointed Director of Operations at the Directorate General for External Security (DGSE).

On September 1, 2018, he was promoted to the rank and appellation of Lieutenant General and appointed head of the Defense Intelligence and Security Directorate (DRSD).

He left the army on September 26, 2022, and joined Sanofi as Safety Director.
