= Laurent Nuñez =

French civil servant and politician (born 1964)

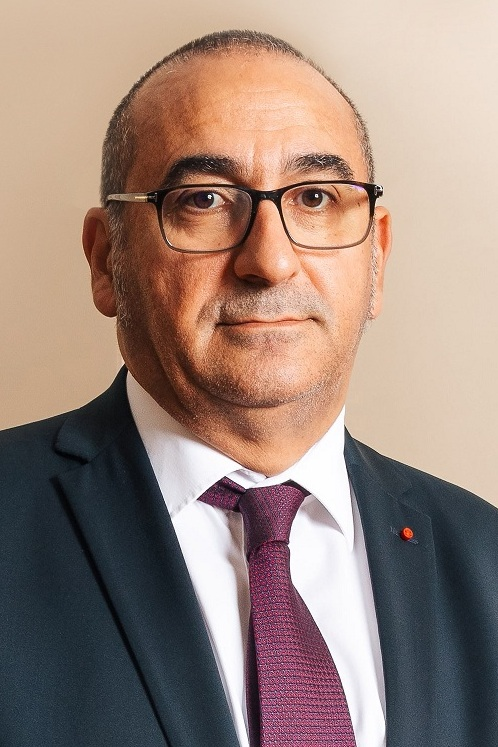
- Official portrait, 2025

Minister of the Interior
- Incumbent
- Assumed office 12 October 2025
- Prime Minister: Sébastien Lecornu
- Preceded by: Bruno Retailleau

Prefect of Police of Paris
- In office 21 July 2022 – 12 October 2025
- Preceded by: Didier Lallement
- Succeeded by: Patrice Faure

Head of the National Centre for Intelligence and Counter-Terrorism
- In office 15 July 2020 – 20 July 2022
- President: Emmanuel Macron
- Preceded by: Pierre de Bousquet de Florian
- Succeeded by: Pascal Mailhos

Secretary of State to the Minister of the Interior
- In office 16 October 2018 – 6 July 2020
- Prime Minister: Édouard Philippe
- Preceded by: Position established
- Succeeded by: Position abolished

Director-General for Internal Security
- In office 22 June 2017 – 16 October 2018
- Preceded by: Patrick Calvar
- Succeeded by: Nicolas Lerner

Personal details
- Born: Laurent Marie Joseph Nuñez; 19 February 1964 (age 62) Bourges, France
- Party: Renaissance
- Education: University of Tours; École nationale d'administration
- Profession: Civil servant

Laurent Marie Joseph Nuñez-Belda (French pronunciation: [lɔʁɑ̃ nuɲɛs bɛlda]; born 19 February 1964) is a French senior civil servant and politician who has served as Minister of the Interior in the second government of Prime Minister Sébastien Lecornu since 12 October 2025.

He previously served as director-general of the General Directorate for Internal Security (DGSI) from 2017 to 2018, Secretary of State to the Minister of the Interior in the second government of Édouard Philippe from 2018 to 2020, head of the National Centre for Intelligence and Counter-Terrorism (CNRLT) from 2020 to 2022 and Prefect of Police of Paris from 2022 to 2025.

== Early life and education ==
Of Spanish descent, Nuñez was born in Bourges in 1964. His father was an architect; his mother was a teacher. He studied public management at the University of Tours, obtaining a diplôme d'études supérieures spécialisées before joining the French civil service in 1989. In 1999, he graduated from the École nationale d'administration.

== Career ==
A civil servant at the Ministry of the Interior, Nuñez was named chief of staff (directeur de cabinet) of the prefect of Seine-Saint-Denis in 2008. In 2010, he was appointed subprefect of the arrondissement of Bayonne. In 2012, Nuñez became chief of staff at the Paris Police Prefecture, and in 2015 he was appointed police prefect of Bouches-du-Rhône.

As part of the reorganisation of the French intelligence services, Nuñez was appointed director-general at the DGSI in June 2017 by newly elected President Emmanuel Macron, and succeeded Patrick Calvar. He pursued a new policy of "openness".

In October 2018, he was appointed to the government as Secretary of State to the Minister of the Interior, under Minister Christophe Castaner. He was especially responsible for the coordination of the intelligence services and the police.

In July 2020, Nuñez was appointed Head of the National Center of Intelligence and Counter-Terrorism (CNRLT), succeeding Pierre de Bousquet de Florian. In July 2022, he was named Paris police prefect.

=== Minister of the Interior ===
In 2025, he was appointed Minister of the Interior, succeeding Bruno Retailleau, who left the government following policy disagreements.

In early 2026, Nuñez faced the killing of Quentin Deranque in Lyon, which he accused the ultra-left of orchestrating.

In 2026, President Macron refused Nuñez's request to resign after the 17 October riots, part of the wider 2026 French civil unrest, arguing that the security forces needed "continuous command in the current situation".

== Honours ==
=== National honours ===
- Commander of the Legion of Honour (2025)
- Officer of the Ordre national du Mérite (2015)
- Honour medal of the National Police, Gold (2024)

=== Foreign honours ===
- On 26 September 2016, Nuñez was awarded the Insignia rank of the Order of the Aztec Eagle by the then president of Mexico, Enrique Peña Nieto.
