= Nicolas Lerner =

French civil servant (born 1978)

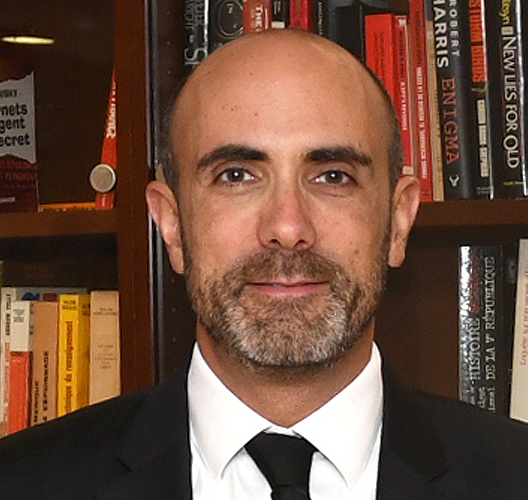
- Born: 29 June 1978 (age 48); 14th arrondissement of Paris, France
- Education: Sciences Po; École nationale d'administration
- Occupation: Civil servant
- Office: Director General of Internal Security (2018–2024); Director General of External Security (2024–present)

Nicolas Lerner (French pronunciation: [nikɔla lɛʁnɛʁ]; born 29 June 1978) is a French senior civil servant. He served as Director General of Internal Security (DGSI) from 2018 to 2024. On 20 December 2023, he was appointed by the Council of Ministers as Director General of External Security (DGSE), effective 9 January 2024.

== Career ==
A civil servant at the Ministry of the Interior, Lerner was deputy chief of staff to the Paris Police Prefect under Chief of Staff Laurent Nuñez from 2012 to 2014 and subprefect of the arrondissement of Béziers from 2014 to 2015. In 2018, while deputy chief of staff to the Minister of the Interior, Lerner was appointed head of the Directorate General of Internal Security (DGSI). He became the youngest head of French internal intelligence, at the age of 40.

Lerner was appointed Director General of External Security (DGSE), effective 9 January 2024, with the mission, in particular, of modernising the service. He is reported as having a keen interest for Africa, as well as the Middle East.

He was at the centre of a controversy in 2025. He was accused by Telegram founder Pavel Durov of having interfered with the Romanian presidential election by asking him to suppress certain "conservative" messages and by traveling to Romania a few days before the second round. Durov did not provide any proof to sustain either of these accusations. These "fake news" were rejected by the Romanian Foreign Intelligence Service, calling them "attempts at manipulation and disinformation", and by the French DGSE.

== Honours ==
- Knight of the Legion of Honour (2022)
- Knight of the Ordre national du Mérite (2017)
