= Philippe Crouzet =

French businessman

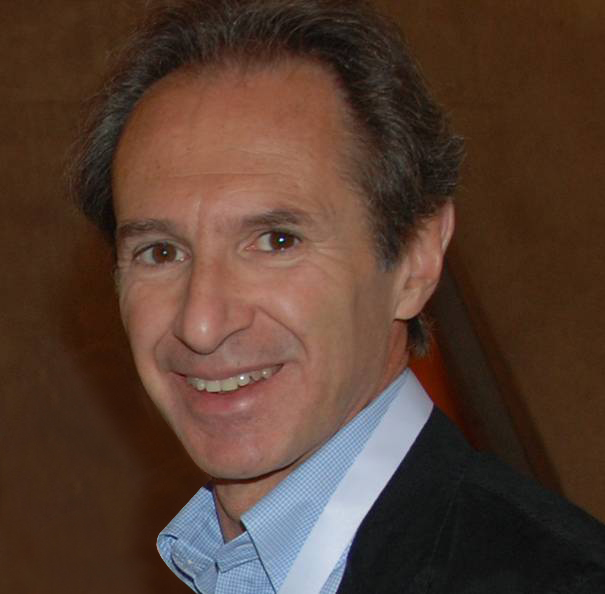
- Born: 18 October 1956 (age 69); Neuilly-sur-Seine, France
- Education: Lycée Pasteur; Sciences Po, ÉNA
- Occupation: CEO of Vallourec
- Spouse: Sylvie Hubac (m. 1983)

Philippe Crouzet (born 18 October 1956 in Neuilly-sur-Seine) is a French businessman, former chairman of the management board of Vallourec (Euronext: VK) between April 2009 and March 2020, when he was replaced by Edouard Guinotte.

== Biography ==
=== Early life ===
Philippe Crouzet graduated from Sciences Po in 1976 and the École nationale d'administration in 1981.

=== Career ===
He served as counsel (Maître des requêtes) to the Conseil d'Etat.

In 1986, he joined Saint-Gobain as director of corporate planning. Three years later, in 1989, he was appointed general manager of the paper business unit (Papeteries de Condat). From 1992 to 1996, he was a general delegate for Spain and Portugal, and then CEO of the ceramics division until 2000. He later served as Senior Vice-President of the Group in charge of Finance, Purchasing and Information Systems. From 2005 to 2009, he served as Senior Vice-President in charge of the building distribution sector.

=== Personal life and interests ===
He is married to Sylvie Hubac, who served as the Chief of Staff of President François Hollande from 2012 to 2015.

Philippe Crouzet is the founder and president of ARES, an association specializing in professional reinsertion of socially impaired persons in the Île-de-France area.

Business positions
Preceded by Pierre Verluca	CEO of Vallourec; 2009–2020	Succeeded by Edouard Guinotte
