= Bernard Gérard =

Bernard Gérard may refer to:

- Bernard Gérard (politician) (born 1953), member of the National Assembly of France
- Bernard Gérard (intelligence officer), French intelligence officer
- Bernard Gérard (composer) (1930–2000), French composer of film scores
