= Emmanuelle Mignon =

French politician (born 1968)

Representative of the French Co-Prince of Andorra
- In office 6 June 2007 – 24 September 2008
- Monarch: Nicolas Sarkozy
- Prime Minister: Albert Pintat
- Preceded by: Philippe Massoni
- Succeeded by: Christian Frémont

Personal details
- Born: 26 April 1968 (age 58) Paris, France
- Education: Lycée Sainte-Geneviève
- Alma mater: ESSEC Business School, Sciences Po, ÉNA

Emmanuelle Mignon (French pronunciation: [emanɥɛl miɲɔ̃]; born 26 April 1968) served as cabinet director for French president Nicolas Sarkozy between May 2007 and July 2008.

== Education ==
Emmanuelle Mignon graduated from ESSEC business school in 1990. In 1992, she graduated from Institut d’études politiques of Paris (IEP Paris), 1992. She also studied at the ENA school (Ecole nationale d’administration) for high-level civil servants and graduated at the top of her class in 1995.

Previously, Mignon had studied at the private collège Saint-Marie in Neuilly, near Paris, and at the private Lycée Sainte-Geneviève in Versailles.

== Career ==
She was nominated as adviser to the cabinet of the Minister of the Interior Nicolas Sarkozy, in charge of legal issues and civil liberties, and later as in charge of industrial competition and the agreement on price reductions at the Ministry of Economy and Finance, again under Sarkozy. On 16 May 2007, on the day of his inauguration as President of the Republic, Nicolas Sarkozy appointed her as his chief of staff.

From 2010 to 2012, she served as General Secretary at EuropaCorp.

In 2015 after being admitted to the Paris Bar, she joined the Public Regulatory Environment department of August Debouzy as a partner. Mignon also worked as rapporteur at the litigation division and the internal affairs division, as well as manager of the legal research center, government commissioner and assessor.

On 3 June 2015, she was questioned in the investigation into the "Élysée polls" affair. On 22 January 2022, she was sentenced to 6 months in prison with a suspended sentence for having "intentionally sacrificed respect for the republican rule of law that she was supposed to embody in her capacity as Chief of Staff to the President of the Republic to the satisfaction of private interests expressed by two people close to the Head of State". Mignon and three co-defendants, former Nicolas Sarkozy chief of staff Claude Gueant, writer and one-time Sarkozy advisor Patrick Buisson and former pollster and consultant Pierre Giacometti, were found guilty of polling fraud involving allegations that they misused public money while ordering public opinion polls worth a combined 7.5 million euros ($8.7 million) during the course of Sarkozy's presidency.

She was appointed in Fall 2023 as vice-president of Les Républicains, in charge of building the party's project for the European elections in June 2024 and the presidential election in 2027.

== Publications ==
- August Debouzy advises Cameco on French law aspects of acquisition of Westinghouse Electric Company - Lucie Constant, Philippe Durand, Amélie Tripet, David Neuwirth, Benjamin van Gaver, Vincent Brenot, François Pochart, Valéry Denoix de Saint Marc, Emmanuelle Mignon, Alexandra Berg-Moussa, Pierre Descheemaeker, Renaud Christol, Marie-Charlotte Hustache, Olivier Attias, Marc-Antoine Picquier, Geoffroy Thill, Boris Léone-Robin, Guillaume Potin, Aurélien Micheli, Charles Maurel, Ergen Ege, Alexandre Bay, Pierre-Olivier Ally, Philippe Alliaume, Dorian Scemama, Guillaume Aubatier, Audrey Msellati, Juliette Vachet, Alix Kianpour, Julien Tiphine － 17/10/22
- August Debouzy advised Rohde & Schwarz group on the sale of Rohde & Schwarz Cybersecurity SAS to Total Specific Solutions B.V - Florence Chafiol, Valéry Denoix de Saint Marc, Philippe Durand, Philippe Lorentz, Emmanuelle Mignon, François Pochart, Elie Bétard, Stéphanie Lapeyre, Geoffroy Thill, Thibaut Amourette, David Neuwirth, Alexandre Dumortier, Nicolas Quoy, Ludovic de Talancé, Laure Bonin, Emmanuel Le Galloc'h, Lea Margono － 14/04/22
- Digital Markets Act - Emmanuelle Mignon, Mahasti Razavi, Eden Gall － 25/03/22
- Réforme des CCAG - Vincent Brenot, Emmanuelle Mignon, Hélène Billery － 01/04/21

Government offices
Preceded by Philippe Massoni	Representative of the French Co-Prince of Andorra; 2007–2008	Succeeded by Christian Frémont
