= Frédéric de Saint-Sernin =

French politician and businessman

Representative of the French Co-Prince of Andorra
- In office 1999–2002
- Monarch: Jacques Chirac
- Prime Minister: Marc Forné Molné
- Preceded by: Pierre de Bousquet de Florian
- Succeeded by: Philippe Massoni

Personal details
- Born: 14 February 1958 (age 68) Reims, France
- Party: RPR; UMP

Frédéric Marie Joseph Bruno de Laparre de Saint-Sernin is a French politician and businessman, born 14 February 1958 in Reims.

He was the representative of former French Co-Prince Jacques Chirac in Andorra until 2002. He was also an adviser to the French President between 1999 and 2006.

He has twice been elected to the French Parliament, representing Dordogne for the right-wing political party Union pour un Mouvement Populaire (1993–1997 and 2002–2004).

He was secretary of state (French minor minister) for spatial planning from 2004 to 2005. Since 4 December 2006, he has been chair of the football team Stade Rennais.

Government offices
Preceded by –	Representative of the French Co-Prince of Andorra; 1999–2002	Succeeded by Philippe Massoni
