= Eduard Ibáñez =

Spanish civil servant (born 1969)

Representative of the Episcopal Co-Prince of Andorra
- Incumbent
- Assumed office 27 November 2023
- Monarchs: Joan Enric Vives i Sicília; Josep-Lluís Serrano Pentinat
- Prime Minister: Xavier Espot Zamora
- Preceded by: Josep Maria Mauri

Personal details
- Born: 14 May 1969 (age 57) Barcelona, Spain
- Education: University of Barcelona; Ramon Llull University

Eduard Ibáñez i Pulido (born 14 May 1969) is a Spanish civil servant and lawyer. He has served as the personal representative of the episcopal co-prince of Andorra, initially for Joan Enric Vives i Sicília and currently for Josep-Lluís Serrano Pentinat, since November 2023.

== Early life and education ==
Ibáñez was born on 14 May 1969 in Barcelona. He graduated from the University of Barcelona in 1992 with a degree in law, and later obtained a doctorate in criminal law from the university in 2007. He earned another degree, in philosophy, from Ramon Llull University in 2012.

== Career ==
Ibáñez has been a member of the Barcelona Bar Association since September 1992, and has specialized in the criminal and penitentiary field since January 1993.

He worked the director of the Justice and Peace organization of Barcelona from April 2002 to March 2021, and served as the president of the General Commission for Justice and Peace of Spain from 2010 to 2019. From March 2021 to July 2022, he was a technician for the General Directorate of Religious Affairs, within the Department of Justice of the Generalitat de Catalunya.

In July 2022, Ibáñez was appointed by Joan Enric Vives i Sicília, the bishop of Urgell and episcopal co-prince of Andorra, as deputy to the episcopal co-prince's representative, then Josep Maria Mauri. On 27 November 2023, he was sworn in as the representative of the episcopal co-prince, replacing Mauri. Vives was succeeded as bishop of Urgell and co-prince of Andorra by Josep-Lluís Serrano Pentinat on 31 May 2025, with Ibáñez remaining in his role as representative.

== Personal life ==
Ibáñez is married and has two children.

== See also ==
- List of representatives of the co-princes of Andorra
- Politics of Andorra
