= Nemesi Marquès i Oste =

Representative to Andorra of the Bishop of Urgell

Representative of the Episcopal Co-Prince of Andorra
- In office 30 July 1993 – 20 July 2012
- Monarchs: Joan Martí Alanis; Joan Enric Vives Sicília
- Prime Minister: Òscar Ribas Reig; Marc Forné Molné; Albert Pintat; Jaume Bartumeu; Pere López Agràs (Acting); Antoni Martí
- Preceded by: Francesc Badia Batalla as Episcopal Veguer
- Succeeded by: Josep Maria Mauri

Personal details
- Born: 17 May 1935 (age 90) Cabó, Spain

Nemesi Marquès i Oste (born 17 May 1935) is a former personal representative to Andorra of the Bishop of Urgell, who is one of the co-princes of Andorra. He is a Roman Catholic priest, and has been rector of Bellestar, a village of 55 inhabitants.

He was succeeded as representative of the episcopal co-prince by Josep Maria Mauri on 20 July 2012.

== See also ==
- List of national leaders
- Politics of Andorra

Government offices
New office	Representative of the Episcopal Co-Prince of Andorra; 1993–2012	Succeeded by Josep Maria Mauri
