= Philippe Massoni =

French politician (1936–2015)

Representative of the French Co-Prince of Andorra
- In office 26 July 2002 – 6 June 2007
- Monarchs: Jacques Chirac; Nicolas Sarkozy
- Prime Minister: Marc Forné Molné; Albert Pintat
- Preceded by: Frédéric de Saint-Sernin
- Succeeded by: Emmanuelle Mignon

Personal details
- Born: 13 January 1936 Marseille, France
- Died: 14 February 2015 (aged 79) Paris, France

Philippe Massoni (13 January 1936 – 14 February 2015) was a French prefect. He was the French co-prince's representative to Andorra from July 2002 to June 2007, replacing Frédéric de Saint-Sernin.

He had previously been chief of police for Paris.

Government offices
Preceded by Frédéric de Saint-Sernin	Representative of the French Co-Prince of Andorra; 2002–2007	Succeeded by Emmanuelle Mignon
