= Georges-François Leclerc =

French civil servant (born 1966)

Representative of the French Co-Prince of Andorra
- In office 10 November 2025 – 6 June 2026
- Monarch: Emmanuel Macron
- Prime Minister: Xavier Espot Zamora
- Preceded by: Patrice Faure
- Succeeded by: Frédéric Rose

Prefect of Provence-Alpes-Côte d'Azur
- In office 21 January 2025 – 10 November 2025
- Preceded by: Christophe Mirmand
- Succeeded by: Jacques Witkowski

Personal details
- Born: 26 October 1966 (age 59) Suresnes, Hauts-de-Seine, France

Georges-François Leclerc (born 26 October 1966) is a French civil servant served as the representative of Emmanuel Macron as co-prince of Andorra from 2025 to 2026. From 2024 to 2025, he served as prefect of Provence-Alpes-Côte d'Azur.. From 2021 to 2024, he served as prefect of Hauts-de-France. From 2019 to 2021, he served as prefect of Seine-Saint-Denis. From 2016 to 2019, he served as prefect of Alpes-Maritimes. From 2012 to 2016, he served as prefect of Haute-Savoie. From 2010 to 2011, he served as prefect of Aube.
