= Francesc Badia i Batalla =

Andorran public servant and historian (1923–2020)

Episcopal Veguer of Andorra
- In office 19 April 1972 – 4 May 1993
- Monarchs: Joan Martí Alanis; Joan Enric Vives Sicília
- Prime Minister: Òscar Ribas Reig; Marc Forné Molné; Albert Pintat; Jaume Bartumeu; Pere López Agràs (Acting); Antoni Martí
- Preceded by: Jaume Sansa Nequí
- Succeeded by: Nemesi Marqués Oste as Representative of the Episcopal Co-Prince

Personal details
- Born: 10 January 1923 Montblanc, Tarragona, Spain
- Died: 14 August 2020 (aged 97) Andorra

Francesc Badia i Batalla (10 January 1923 – 14 August 2020) was an Andorran public servant and historian. He served as the Episcopal Veguer of Andorra from 1972 until 1993. He also served as a judge of the Tribunal of the Courts of Andorra over the same time frame.
