= Jacques Witkowski =

French civil servant

Prefect of Seine-Saint-Denis
- Incumbent
- Assumed office 19 July 2021
- Preceded by: Georges-François Leclerc

Prefect of Herault
- In office 26 August 2019 – 19 July 2021
- Preceded by: Pierre Pouëssel
- Succeeded by: Hugues Moutouh

Personal details
- Born: 21 January 1963 (age 63) Le Creusot, Saône-et-Loire, France
- Occupation: Civil servant

Jacques Witkowski (born 21 January 1963) is a French civil servant. From 30 January 2013 until 30 July 2014 he served as the Prefect of Mayotte. He was succeeded by Seymour Morsy.

== Honours ==
Witkowski is a recipient of the Legion of Honour.
