= Henri Biard =

French official (1915–1988)

- Born: 1915
- Died: 1988 (aged 72–73)
- Occupation: Director of the Direction de la surveillance du territoire (DST)

Henri Biard was the director of the Direction de la surveillance du territoire (DST), the French counterintelligence and domestic intelligence service from 1972 to 1974. Biard ordered DST agents to illegally wiretap the offices of Le Canard enchaîné, a French newspaper. When this decision was made public, Biard was forced to resign.

== Bibliography ==
- Wendell L. Minnick. Spies and Provocateurs. p. 17
