= List of representatives of the co-princes of Andorra =

This article lists the representatives of the co-princes of Andorra —originally the bishop of Urgell and the count of Foix; currently, the bishop of Urgell and the president of France. The co-princes appoint the representatives to represent them in matters of the state, similar to the function of a governor-general or viceroy. Until the Constitution of 1993 was enacted, the episcopal and French representatives were titled Veguers and Viguiers respectively. They are now titled the Personal Representatives of their respective co-prince.

== Episcopal representatives ==
Veguers
| Began | Ended | Name | Lifespan |
|---|---|---|---|
| c. 1356 | c. 1360 | Roger de Besora | |
| c. 1364 | | Ferrer de Perves | |
| c. 1366 | | Marti Gomis de Luna | |
| c. 1372 | | Huguet d'Areny | |
| c. 1393 | | Francesc Guillem de Navès | |
| c. 1405 | c. 1430 | Guillem Ramon Graner | |
| c. 1416 | | Arnau Real | |
| c. 1421 | | Vicenç de la Figuera | |
| c. 1430 | c. 1434 | Guiu Catell | |
| c. 1440 | c. 1442 | Joan Sulla | |
| c. 1442 | c. 1444 | Bernat de Pallerols | |
| c. 1445 | c. 1448 | Guillem de Campa | |
| 10 March 1463 | c. 1473 | Pere de Paüls | |
| c. 1487 | | Guillem d'Erill | |
| c. 1505 | | Josep de Riba | |
| c. 1516 | | Damià Simon | |
| c. 1554 | | Joan de Sulla | |
| c. 1571 | | Joanot Ribot | |
| 1580 | 1582 | Joan Roig i de Castellví | |
| c. 1587 | | Boquet | |
| 1602 | | Isidoro d'Aguilar | |
| 3 February 1628 | | Alexandre de Taverner i de Montornés | |
| 1664 | | Armanter Aguilar | |
| c. 1679 | | Anton Pera i de Tord | |
| c. 1705 | c. 1715 | Francesc Carreu | |
| 1736? | 1737? | Antoni Peguera | |
| 1737 | 1748 | Antoni Fiter i Rossell | 1706–1748 |
| 1748 | c. 1754 | Pere Fiter i Rossell | |
| 1756 | 1777 | Guillem Moles i Rossell | 1705–1788 |
| 1777 | | Guillem Areny i Montargull | 1730–1806 |
| 1789 | | Pere Mateu Moles | |
| 1845 | 1858 | Bonaventura Riba | |
| 1858 | | Guillem Torres | |
| c. 1863 | | Antoni Rossell | |
| 1860s | 1868 | Manuel Amalot | |
| 9 August 1868 | 1881 | Pere Dallerés i Sucrana | |
| 22 January 1881 | 1881 | Pere Canturri | |
| 1 July 1881 | 1882 | Josep Oriol Dodero i Ponte | |
| 27 July 1882 | 1885 | Francesc Pallerola | ?–1920 |
| 16 April 1885 | 1886 | Antoni Cerqueda | |
| 8 November 1886 | 1915 | Francesc Pallerola | ?–1920 |
| 17 May 1915 | 1933 | Joseph de Riba | |
| 3 July 1933 | 1934 | Enric de Llorens i Ribas | |
| 3 February 1934 | 1936 | Jaume Sansa i Nequí | 1908–1977 |
| 1936 | 1937 | Francesc Cairat i Freixes (acting) | 1880–1968 |
| 1937 | 1972 | Jaume Sansa i Nequí | 1908–1977 |
| 19 April 1972 | 4 May 1993 | Francesc Badia i Batalla | 1923–2020 |
Personal Representative of the Episcopal Co-Prince
| 4 May 1993 | 20 July 2012 | Nemesi Marquès i Oste (acting to 24 February 1994) | 1935– |
| 20 July 2012 | 27 November 2023 | Josep Maria Mauri | 1941– |
| 27 November 2023 | present | Eduard Ibáñez Pulido | 1969– |

== French representatives ==
Viguiers
| Began | Ended | Name | Lifespan |
|---|---|---|---|
| c. 1144 | c. 1185 | Ramon de Falguera | |
| 1201 | | Ramon de Carmanill | |
| 1200s | | P.R. de Falguera | |
| c. 1314 | c. 1331 | Pere Arnau de Castellverdú | |
| c. 1356 | | Guillem Jaculatori d'Ax | |
| c. 1353 | c. 1391 | Arnau de Cos | |
| c. 1364 | c. 1366 | Ramon d'Ornac | |
| c. 1391 | | Bernat Saquet | |
| c. 1405 | | Guissard de Nadaylles | |
| c. 1419 | | Joan de Gots | |
| c. 1419 | | Ramon de Capdevila | |
| c. 1433 | | de Ponts | |
| c. 1445 | c. 1448 | Guillem Arnau de Léo | |
| c. 1465 | c. 1468 | Menaud de Lobie | |
| c. 1487 | | Arnau Corts | |
| c. 1489 | | Joan de Milglos | |
| c. 1547 | | Joan de Fers | |
| 1572 | | Roc Godofré | |
| January 1584 | | de Brimon | |
| 1618 | 1628 | Guillaume de Prétiane | |
| 1628 | 1632 | Jean de Prétiane | |
| 1646 | | Armand-Jean du Peyré | 1598–1672 |
| c. 1648 | | François de Murat Boquet | |
| 29 October 1662 | c. 1682 | Jérôme Fornier | |
| 1702 | 8 August 1715 | François de Moreau | |
| 1715 | 14 February 1755 | Jean-François de Moreau | |
| 1759 | 1760 | Louis Gaspard de Sales | 1707–1796 |
| 1760 | | Jean-François de Moreau | |
| 5 December 1735 | 1768 | Jean de Perpère | ?–1768 |
| 1780 | 1783 | Louis Auguste Le Tonnelier de Breteuil | 1730–1807 |
| 14 October 1788 | 1806 | Joseph Bonifaci Goma Montou | |
| 15 October 1806 | 1820 | Joseph Pilhes | 1740–1832 |
| 22 September 1820 | 1831 | Pierre Roch de Roussillon | 1785–1874 |
| 18 January 1835 | 1867 | Lucien de Saint-André | 1797–? |
| 24 October 1867 | 1880 | Henri de Foix-Fabas | 1833–1908 |
| 22 February 1880 | 1 February 1882 | Albert Tibulle Ladevèze | |
| 1 February 1882 | 26 February 1882 | Alexandre Napoléon Mancini | 1832–? |
| 26 February 1882 | 3 July 1882 | Albert Tibulle Ladevèze | |
| 3 July 1882 | 1886 | Bonaventura Vigo | 1836–1886 |
| 7 June 1886 | 31 January 1887 | Jacques-Emmanuel Varenne | |
| 3 February 1887 | March 1933 | Charles Romeu | 1854–1933 |
| 12 March 1933 | August 1937 | Henri Samalens | 1871–1937 |
| 30 November 1937 | 2 December 1940 | Jean-Baptiste Laumond | 1865–1957 |
| 2 December 1940 | 14 September 1944 | Jules Lasmartres | 1880–1968 |
| 14 September 1944 | 5 May 1945 | Robert Barran | 1918–1978 |
| 5 May 1945 | 23 August 1947 | Georges Degrand | 1875–1948 |
| 23 August 1947 | 21 June 1952 | André Bertrand | 1886–? |
| 21 June 1952 | 20 June 1956 | Guy Menant | 1891–1967 |
| 20 June 1956 | 20 November 1958 | Yves Michel | 1899–? |
| 21 November 1958 | 27 July 1961 | Jean Lafon de Lageneste | 1903–1964 |
| 27 July 1961 | 12 August 1964 | Étienne Vaysset | 1898–1982 |
| 12 August 1964 | 24 September 1970 | Roger Vincenot | 1912–2003 |
| 24 September 1970 | 11 December 1972 | Hubert Dubois | 1921–2009 |
| 11 December 1972 | 21 June 1977 | Claude Rostain | 1916–2015 |
| 21 June 1977 | 29 August 1980 | André Prunet-Foch | 1914–2017 |
| 29 August 1980 | 18 February 1982 | René Lalouette | 1918–1990 |
| 18 February 1982 | 20 November 1984 | Henri Benoît de Coignac | 1935– |
| 21 November 1984 | 6 July 1989 | Louis Deblé | 1923–2011 |
| 7 July 1989 | 4 May 1993 | Jean-Pierre Courtois | 1947– |
Personal Representatives of the French Co-Prince
| 4 May 1993 | 13 September 1993 | Jean-Pierre Courtois (acting) | 1947– |
| 13 September 1993 | 17 February 1997 | Jean-Yves Caullet | 1957– |
| 17 February 1997 | 25 May 1999 | Pierre de Bousquet de Florian | 1954– |
| 25 May 1999 | 26 July 2002 | Frédéric de Saint-Sernin | 1958– |
| 26 July 2002 | 31 May 2007 | Philippe Massoni | 1936–2015 |
| 31 May 2007 | 24 September 2008 | Emmanuelle Mignon | 1968– |
| 24 September 2008 | 21 May 2012 | Christian Frémont | 1942–2014 |
| 21 May 2012 | 5 January 2015 | Sylvie Hubac | 1956– |
| 5 January 2015 | 15 June 2016 | Thierry Lataste | 1954– |
| 15 June 2016 | 14 May 2017 | Jean-Pierre Hugues | 1951– |
| 14 May 2017 | 20 November 2024 | Patrick Strzoda | 1952– |
| 20 November 2024 | 10 November 2025 | Patrice Faure | 1967– |
| 10 November 2025 | 6 June 2026 | Georges-François Leclerc | 1966– |
| 6 June 2026 | present | Frédéric Rose | 1974– |

== See also ==
- Episcopal Veguer
- French Viguier
