= Christian Frémont =

Representative of the French Co-Prince of Andorra
- In office 24 September 2008 – 21 May 2012
- Monarch: Nicolas Sarkozy
- Prime Minister: Albert Pintat; Jaume Bartumeu; Pere López Agràs (Acting); Antoni Martí
- Preceded by: Emmanuelle Mignon
- Succeeded by: Sylvie Hubac

Personal details
- Born: 23 April 1942 Champagnac-de-Belair, Dordogne, France
- Died: 3 August 2014 (aged 72) Paris, France
- Party: UMP
- Education: National School of Administration, Strasbourg

Christian Frémont (23 April 1942 – 3 August 2014) was the chief of staff for Nicolas Sarkozy. He was also the Representative of the French Co-Prince of Andorra from September 2008 to May 2012. He died of cancer in August 2014.

Government offices
Preceded by Emmanuelle Mignon	Representative of the French Co-Prince of Andorra; 2008–2012	Succeeded by Sylvie Hubac
