= Henri de Coignac =

French ambassador and French Viguier of Andorra

French Viguier of Andorra
- In office 1982–1984
- Monarch: François Mitterrand
- Preceded by: René Lalouette
- Succeeded by: Louis Deblé

Personal details
- Born: 3 October 1935 (age 90) Rodez, Aveyron, France

Henri Benoît de Coignac (born 3 October 1935 in Rodez) is a retired French diplomat.

== Career ==
He graduated from the Faculty of Law at the University of Paris and then entered the Ministry of Foreign Affairs. He held various roles during the presidency of François Mitterrand, serving as the executor (viguier de France) of President Mitterrand in Andorra between 1982 and 1984, Chief of Protocol between 1984 and 1988, ambassador to Spain between 1988 and 1993, and ambassador to Morocco between 1993 and 1995. He then held a passive position as diplomatic advisor to the Council of Ministers between 1996 and 1997, and was the ambassador to Ireland between 1997 and 2001 with the Plural Left government, before his retirement in 2001.

== Personal life ==
He is an officer of the Legion of Honour, a chévalier of the Ordre national du Mérite, and a chévalier of the Ordre des Palmes académiques, as well as having received various honours from other countries.
