= Thierry Lataste =

French civil servant

High Commissioner of New Caledonia
- In office 20 June 2016 – 10 July 2019
- President: François Hollande; Emmanuel Macron
- Preceded by: Laurent Cabrera
- Succeeded by: Laurent Prévost
- In office 19 July 1999 – 29 July 2002
- President: Jacques Chirac
- Preceded by: Dominique Bur
- Succeeded by: Alain Triolle
- In office 29 July 1994 – 12 August 1994
- President: François Mitterrand
- Preceded by: Alain Christnacht
- Succeeded by: Didier Cultiaux

Representative of the French Co-Prince of Andorra
- In office 5 January 2015 – 15 June 2016
- Monarch: François Hollande
- Prime Minister: Antoni Martí; Gilbert Saboya Sunyé (acting)
- Preceded by: Sylvie Hubac
- Succeeded by: Jean-Pierre Hugues

Personal details
- Born: Thierry Lataste; 31 January 1954 (age 72) Talence, Gironde Department

Thierry Lataste (born 31 January 1954 in Talence, Gironde Department) is a senior French civil servant, who served as High Commissioner of New Caledonia from July to August 1994, 1999 to 2002, and again from 2016 to 2019.

From 5 January 2015 to 15 June 2016 he was the personal representative of the Co-Prince of Andorra.

== Biography ==
=== Youth and training ===
Thierry Lataste is a graduate of the Institut d'études politiques de Paris in 1978, a former student of the École normale supérieure and of the École nationale d'administration (ENA or transl. National School of Administration) in 1982.

=== Career ===
When he left the ENA in June 1982, Lataste was named civil administrator 2nd class of the Ministry of Interior and Decentralization. In September, he became sub-prefect, director of the cabinet of the Commissioner of the Republic of Vaucluse. In October 1983, he was appointed sub-prefect outside the framework and became director of Pierre Mauroy's cabinet in Lille. In 1985, he became secretary general of the prefecture of Deux-Sèvres. He was reinstated as a civil administrator and became secretary general of New Caledonia. He stayed there for three years, and in October 1994 became sub-prefect of Senlis. He was chief of staff to Secretary of State for Overseas Jean-Jack Queyranne from 1997 to 2000. At the end of this year, he becomes prefect, government delegate, High Commissioner of the Republic in New Caledonia. In 2002, he became the prefect of Savoie, then two years later, prefect of Pyrénées-Orientales. He later became prefect of Vendée, and prefect of Saône-et-Loire.

In July 2012, he became the prefect of the Languedoc-Roussillon region, prefect of Hérault.

On 19 December 2012 he was appointed chief of staff to the Minister of the Interior Manuel Valls.

On 3 January 2015 he was appointed chief of staff of the president of the Republic François Hollande and personal representative of the president of the Republic as Co-Prince in Andorra, replacing Sylvie Hubac as of 5 January 2015. He was assisted by Constance Rivière.

He performed this function until 25 May 2016, the date on which he was appointed High Commissioner of the Republic in New Caledonia with the charge of organizing the 2018 referendum on the independence of New Caledonia. On 15 June 2016 he was replaced by Jean-Pierre Hugues, a retired prefect.

=== New Caledonia ===
As chief of staff to Secretary of State for Overseas Jean-Jack Queyranne from 1997 to 2000, Thierry Lataste negotiated with New Caledonians following the Matignon agreements of 1988, he was one of the main negotiators of the Nouméa Accord that he signed on 5 May 1998 as representative of the Secretary of State for Overseas. From July 1999 until 2002, he was appointed the high commissioner of the Republic in New Caledonia.

=== Significant actions ===
As the high commissioner of the Republic in New Caledonia, he was especially confronted with the violent clashes which from December 2001 opposed certain Kanak inhabitants of the Saint-Louis tribe to members of the Wallisian and Futunian community.

== Distinctions ==
- Commander of the National Order of Merit on 2 May 2017
- Officer of the Legion of Honor on 30 January 2008
- 1st class in the Order of Merit of the Federal Republic of Germany.
