= Patrick Buisson =

French journalist (1949–2023)

- Born: 19 April 1949; Paris, France
- Died: 26 December 2023 (aged 74); Les Sables-d'Olonne, France
- Education: Lycée Pasteur; Paris West University Nanterre La Défense
- Occupations: Essayist, journalist, political advisor
- Children: 1

Patrick Buisson (19 April 1949 – 26 December 2023) was a French right-wing essayist, journalist and political advisor. He was a journalist for Minute, Valeurs Actuelles and Le Crapouillot as well as La Chaîne Info. He wrote several books about Vichy France, the Algerian War and the Indochina War. The founder and co-owner of Publifact, a polling agency, he was a key advisor to former President Nicolas Sarkozy from 2006 to 2012, during which time he surreptitiously recorded private conversations he had with the president. He was the co-presenter of Historiquement show, a television program on Histoire, a subsidiary of the TF1 Group, which he chaired.

== Early life ==
Patrick Buisson was born on 19 April 1949 in Paris. His father, Georges Buisson, an engineer for Électricité de France, was a member of the Camelots du Roi, and later the Rally for the Republic. His parents divorced when he was five years old, and he lived with his mother. Together, they demonstrated for the Hungarian Revolution of 1956, which attempted to rid Hungary of Soviet influence. When he was twelve years old, he went to live with his father.

Buisson was educated at the Lycée Pasteur in Neuilly-sur-Seine, near Paris. He received a PhD in History from Paris West University Nanterre La Défense, where his thesis supervisor was Raoul Girardet.

== Career ==
Buisson started his career as a history teacher. In 1981, he started writing for Minute. He later wrote for Valeurs Actuelles. He also wrote for Le Crapouillot.

Buisson wrote several books. One of his earliest books was about the Organisation armée secrète and Jean-Marie Le Pen. He also expressed his enthusiasm for order and hierarchies. Additionally, he wrote a book about Sacha Guitry and co-wrote a book about Léo Ferré. Later, he wrote history books about the Algerian War, the Indochina War and Vichy France. His book about eroticism during Vichy France, which suggests many French women had sexual intercourse with German invaders during World War II, was adapted as a film entitled Love and Sex under Nazi Occupation in 2011.

Buisson served as a political advisor to Philippe de Villiers in the 1990s and early 2000s. He served as a political advisor to President Nicolas Sarkozy from 2006 to 2012. He played a key role in Sarkozy's victory during the 2007 presidential election. He suggested renegotiating the Évian Accords, which give special visas to Algerians when they visit France, but Sarkozy turned down the idea. He was described by Le Monde as "one of the Fifth Republic's most influential advisors."

Buisson founded Publifact, a polling firm, in Lyon in 1982. He owned 58%. In 2008, the firm received €1,082,400 from the Élysée for various polls and reports. In 2009, Buisson received €10,000 each month as a consultant.

In February 2014, Le Point revealed that Buisson had surreptitiously recorded private conversations he had had with President Sarkozy. A month later, in March 2014, Le Canard enchaîné published the transcripts. Buisson's son, Georges, denied being the one who leaked them.

Buisson was a television journalist for La Chaîne Info. He was also the co-creator of 100% Politique, a TV program, with David Pujadas, and Politiquement Show, another TV program, with Michel Field. He served as the Chairman of Histoire, a TV channel which is a subsidiary of the TF1 Group, beginning in 2007. His contract was renewed in 2015. He presented Historiquement show, a history TV program, with Michel Field.

Buisson received the Legion of Honour on 24 September 2007.

== Personal life ==
Buisson was a Roman Catholic "by tradition," and attended the Latin Mass.

Patrick Buisson had a son, Georges, who is co-owner of Publifact and works for the Histoire TV channel, formerly with his father. In June 2015, he published a book about his father, entitled L'Ennemi.

Grave of Patrick Buisson

On 21 January 2022, Buisson and three co-defendants, former Sarkozy chief of staff Claude Guéant, former cabinet director Emmanuelle Mignon and former pollster and consultant Pierre Giacometti, were found guilty of polling fraud involving allegations that they misused public money while ordering public opinion polls worth a combined €7.5 million ($8.7 million) during the course of Sarkozy's presidency between 2007 and 2012. Buisson would receive no jail time in his sentence, was instead handed a two-year suspended sentence and a €150,000 fine.

=== Death ===
On 26 December 2023, his body was discovered. He was 74.

== Honours ==
- Chevalier (knight) of the Order of the Legion of Honor
- Commander of the Order of St-Gregory the Great

== Bibliography ==
- OAS : Histoire de la résistance française en Algérie (with Pascal Gauchon, Bièvres: Jeune Pied-Noir, 1984, 168 pages).
- L'Album Le Pen (with Alain Renault, Écully: Intervalles, 1984, 155 pages).
- Avec le temps / C'est l'histoire d'un métamec (with Léo Ferré, illustrated by Hubert Grooteclaes, Paris: Éditions du Chêne, 1995, 149 pages).
- Sacha Guitry et ses femmes (Paris: Éditions Albin Michel, 1996, 321 pages).
- Vichy ou les infortunes de la vertu (Paris: Éditions Albin Michel, 2008, 570 pages).
- De la grande prostituée à la revanche des mâles (Paris: Éditions Albin Michel, 2008, 521 pages).
- La Grande Guerre, 1914-1918 (with Jean-Pascal Soudagne, prefaced by Max Gallo, Paris: XO éditions, 351 pages).
- La Guerre d'Algérie (prefaced by Michel Déon, illustrated by Marc Flament, Paris: Éditions Albin Michel, 2009, 271 pages).
- La Guerre d'Indochine (prefaced by Pierre Schoendoerffer, Paris: Éditions Albin Michel, 2009, 255 pages).
- L'Occupation intime (Paris: Éditions Albin Michel, 2011, 319 pages).
- Le Paris de Céline (Paris: Éditions Albin Michel, 2012).
- La Cause du peuple (Paris: Perrin, 2016).
