= Laurent Prévost =

French civil servant (born 1967)

High Commissioner of the Republic in New Caledonia
- In office 5 August 2019 – 12 June 2021
- President: Emmanuel Macron
- Preceded by: Thierry Lataste
- Succeeded by: Patrice Faure

Prefect of Martinique
- In office 2 March 2011 – 31 July 2014
- President: Nicolas Sarkozy; François Hollande
- Preceded by: Ange Mancini
- Succeeded by: Fabrice Rigoulet-Roze

Personal details
- Born: 8 June 1967 (age 58)

Laurent Prévost (born 8 June 1967) is a French civil servant. From 2021 to 2023, he served as prefect of Isère. From 2019 to 2021, he served as high commissioner of the Republic in New Caledonia. From 2017 to 2019, he served as prefect of Val-de-Marne. From 2011 to 2014, he served as prefect of Martinique. From 2009 to 2011, he served as prefect of Haute-Marne.
