= DRSD =

French security agency

Coordinates: 48.8744°N 2.407°E

- Armées françaises
- Seal of the "Direction du renseignement et de la sécurité de la Défense"
- Service branches: Armée de Terre; Marine Nationale; Armée de l'Air; Gendarmerie Nationale

Leadership
- Commander-in-Chief: President Emmanuel Macron
- Minister of the Armed Forces: Sébastien Lecornu
- Chief of Defence: General Thierry Burkhard

Personnel
- Military age: 17 years of age with consent for voluntary military service (2001)
- Active personnel: 259,050 (2006) ranked 14th
- Reserve personnel: 419,000 (2006)
- Deployed personnel: 35,000 (2006 est.)

Expenditure
- Budget: €47,7 billion (ranked 2nd) US$61,5 billion (2008-09)
- Percent of GDP: 2.6% (2005)

Related articles
- History: Military History of France; La Grande Armée
- Ranks: Ranks in the Armée de Terre; Ranks in the Royale

DRSD is the abbreviation of Direction du Renseignement et de la Sécurité de la Défense (French pronunciation: [diʁɛksjɔ̃ dy ʁɑ̃sɛɲmɑ̃ e də la sekyʁite də la defɑ̃s], lit. 'Directorate of Defense Intelligence and Security'), a French security agency which is part of the Ministry of Armed Forces. It was established on 10 October 2016 out of the Directorate for Defense Protection and Security (Direction de la Protection et de la Sécurité de la Défense, DPSD), which was founded on 20 November 1981.

DRSD (at that time DPSD) succeeded the former military security agency in 1981. Its roles are: counter-intelligence, general intelligence, counter-terrorism, and counter-subversion concerning national defense. The military, national defense institution, and defence industry are within its area of responsibility. It is also responsible for ensuring the security of personnel, information, materiel and sensitive facilities within national defense.

It works in conjunction with the Central Directorate of Interior Intelligence, the sub-terrorism Directorate, the Directorate General of External Security and the Directorate of Military Intelligence. DRSD is a member of the French Community of intelligence.

It is governed by Articles D.3126-5 D.3126-9 of Defense Code.

== Missions ==
The management of protection and security of defense is the intelligence available to the Defense Minister to carry out its responsibilities for security of personnel, information, materials and sensitive facilities. Its remit includes the prevention and detection of violations of national defense security.

Like the Directorate General for External Security (DGSE), the DRSD is one of the "intelligence" agencies reporting directly to the Minister of Defense.

The Commission includes a command destined for clearances at different classification levels of information be provided ( "Confidential Defense," "Secret Defense", or "Top Secret Defense"), and monitoring of personnel (military land forces, air, marine, police, defense, health, species and official or civil). The DPSD is present in all the theaters of operations abroad where French forces are engaged. The DPSD also has responsible for industrial security, in relation to the high technical value defence industry companies.

The strength of the DRSD, slightly decreasing from year to year, numbered 1,279 people in 2009.

== Financing ==
In 2004, funds vested in the DRSD (excluding salaries and benefits) amounted to 11.4 million euros, a decrease of 0.6% over 2003. The operating budget in 2004 was 7.7 million euros. Equipment financing (manufacturing and infrastructure) amounted to 3.7 million euros, or 1.7% less than in 2003.

== Directors ==
- Général Pierre Devemy : February 1987 – February 1989
- Général Antonio Jérôme: February 1989 – 1990
- Général de Corps d'Armée Roland Guillaume: 1990 – 1997
- Général de Corps d'Armée Claude Ascensi: 1997 – August 2000
- Contrôleur Général des Armées Dominique Conort: September 2000 – July 2002
- Général de Corps d'Armée Michel Barro: August 2002 – June 2005
- Général de Corps d'Armée Denis Serpollet: July 2005 – 2008
- Général de Corps d'Armée Didier Bolelli: 2008–2010
- Général de Corps Aérien Antoine Creux: 2010–2012
- Général de corps d'armée Jean-Pierre Bosser: November 2012 to August 2014
- Général de corps d'armée Jean-François Hogard: September 2014 to August 2018
- Général de corps d'armée Éric Bucquet: September 2018 to September 2022
- Général de corps d'armée Philippe Susnjara: since October 2022

== Staff ==
In 2004, there were 1,475 people, including 1,097 military and 378 civilians. In 2003, there was a significant shortfall in personnel within the DRSD, with staff levels about 12% below the budgeted allowance.

The 2006 appropriations for DRSD totaled 89.9 million euros, representing 1% more compared to 89 million euros in 2005. Staff costs amounted to 78 million euros, operating expenses at 7.7 million euros and capital spending to 4.2 million euros.

The authorised Personnel establishment for 2006 was 1,459.

In 2006, there were 1,459 people, including 1,090 military and 369 civilians. The DPSD contains a high proportion of non-commissioned officers, who represent two-thirds of military personnel. They are mostly defense security inspectors and shipbuilding security inspectors. Civilian personnel, for their part, constituted 85% of Category C officials and staff workers.

== See also ==
- DGSE
- List of intelligence agencies of France
- General Directorate for Internal Security
- Alliance Base
- Bob Denard, a French mercenary
- Defense Security Service
