= Josep Maria Mauri =

Representative of the Episcopal Co-Prince of Andorra

Representative of the Episcopal Co-Prince of Andorra
- In office 20 July 2012 – 27 November 2023
- Monarch: Joan Enric Vives i Sicília
- Prime Minister: Antoni Martí; Gilbert Saboya Sunyé (Acting); Antoni Martí; Xavier Espot
- Preceded by: Nemesi Marquès i Oste
- Succeeded by: Eduard Ibáñez Pulido

Personal details
- Born: 21 October 1941 (age 84) Alzina de Moror, Catalonia, Spain

Josep Maria Mauri i Prior (born 21 October 1941) is a Spanish Catholic priest from Catalonia and former personal representative of the episcopal co-prince of Andorra, Archbishop Joan Enric Vives i Sicília.

He was born in 1941 in Alzina de Moror, Pallars Jussà, Spain and was ordained a priest in 1965. In 2010, he was appointed Vicar General of the Diocese of Urgell and Deputy of the then personal representative of the episcopal co-prince of Andorra, Nemesi Marqués Oste. On 20 July 2012 he was sworn into office as personal representative. After Josep-Lluís Serrano Pentinat was named as the future replacement for Archbishop Vives, Eduard Ibáñez Pulido was named as Mauri's successor as representative of the co-prince, and Ibáñez was sworn in on 27 November 2023. Mauri continued his service as vicar general, as well as several other posts in the diocese.

== See also ==
- List of national leaders
- Politics of Andorra

Government offices
Preceded by Nemesi Marquès i Oste	Representative of the Episcopal Co-Prince of Andorra; 2012–2023	Succeeded by Eduard Ibáñez Pulido
