= Sylvie Hubac =

French government administrator

Representative of the French Co-Prince of Andorra
- In office 21 May 2012 – 5 January 2015
- Monarch: François Hollande
- Prime Minister: Antoni Martí
- Preceded by: Christian Frémont
- Succeeded by: Thierry Lataste

Personal details
- Born: 5 March 1956 (age 70) Tunis, French Tunisia
- Party: Socialist Party
- Spouse: Philippe Crouzet (m. 1983)
- Education: National Institute of Oriental Languages and Civilizations; Institute of Political Studies, Paris; National School of Administration, Strasbourg

Sylvie Hubac (French pronunciation: [silvi ybak]; born 7 March 1956) is the former chief of staff of President François Hollande and was the personal representative of the French Co-Prince of Andorra between 2012 and 2015.

After having presided over several cultural establishments, she was director of the cabinet of the President of the French Republic from 2012 to 2015 and personal representative of the President of the Republic as co-prince in Andorra. In 2016, she became president of the Réunion des musées nationaux and the Grand Palais des Champs-Élysées. She became president of the Interior section of the Council of State on 5 July 2018.

== Career ==
=== Youth and training ===
Born in Tunis, a few days before the end of the French protectorate, Hubac graduated from the Institute of Political Studies in Paris and the School of Oriental Languages. She also has a law degree. She is a student of the National School of Administration within the Voltaire promotion (same promotion as François Hollande) from which she graduated ranked 5th (general administration route).

=== Career ===
Hubac began her career as an auditor and then master of requests at the Council of State from 1980 to 1988. She was technical adviser to the cabinet of Prime Minister Michel Rocard from 1988 to 1991, then deputy director of the cabinet of Jack Lang, Minister of Culture from 1992 to 1993.

In 1993, she became First Counselor at the French Embassy in Spain, before returning to France in 1996 as Government Commissioner to the litigation section of the Council of State until 1998 when she was appointed Director General of Services at the Ile-de-France region. From 2000 to 2004, she held the position of Director of Music, Dance, Theater and Shows at the Ministry of Culture. From 2004 to 2012, she was president of the 5th sub-section of the litigation section of the Council of State and at the same time president of the Commission for the classification of cinematographic works, as well as President of the Superior Council for Literary and Artistic Property from 2010.

She is a member of the left-liberal think tank Les Gracques. On 15 May 2012, she was appointed director of the cabinet of the President of the French Republic and personal representative of the Head of State of the co-prince in Andorra. She left that position on 5 January 2015, replaced by Thierry Lataste.

On 25 January 2016, Hubac was appointed president of the Réunion des musées nationaux and the Grand Palais des Champs-Élysées (RMN-GP). She was appointed President of the Interior Section of the Council of State in the Council of Ministers on 6 June 2018, to take office on July 5. She replaced Bruno Lasserre, previously promoted to Vice-President of the Council of State.

== Family life ==
In 1983, Hubac married Philippe Crouzet, who since 2009 has been Chairman of the Management Board of Vallourec, an oil and gas drilling company.

== Distinctions ==
- Commander of the Legion of Honor (2017)
- Officer of the National Order of Merit (2008)
- Commander of the Order of Arts and Letters
- Commander of the Order of Saint-Charles (2013)

Government offices
| Preceded by Christian Frémont | Representative of the French Co-Prince of Andorra; 2012–2015 | Succeeded by Thierry Lataste |
