= Patrice Faure =

French civil servant (born 1967)

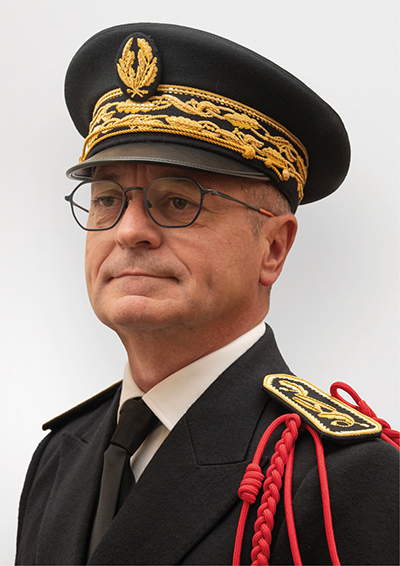
- Faure in 2025

Representative of the French Co-Prince of Andorra
- In office 20 November 2024 – 10 November 2025
- Monarch: Emmanuel Macron
- Prime Minister: Xavier Espot Zamora
- Preceded by: Patrick Strzoda
- Succeeded by: Georges-François Leclerc

High Commissioner of the Republic in New Caledonia
- In office 6 June 2021 – 6 February 2023
- Preceded by: Laurent Prévost
- Succeeded by: Louis Le Franc

Prefect of French Guiana
- In office 28 August 2017 – 10 July 2019
- Preceded by: Martin Jaeger
- Succeeded by: Marc Del Grande

Personal details
- Born: 1967 (age 58–59) Crest, Drôme, France
- Profession: Civil servant

Patrice Faure (born 1967) is a French civil servant. He served as representative of the Co-Prince of Andorra, Emmanuel Macron, serving from November 2024 until November 2025. He previously served as Macron's chief of staff and as the High Commissioner of the Republic in New Caledonia, among other roles.

== Biography ==
Faure was born in 1967 in Crest, Drôme, France. He attended the École militaire interarmes and École d'état-major and holds master's degrees in mathematics and history. He was trained at the National Active Non-Commissioned Officers School from 1986 to 1987 and was a non-commissioned officer from 1987 to 1991, then an officer for the French Army from 1991 to 2001. He commanded a unit of 155 paratroopers and taught at the École spéciale militaire de Saint-Cyr from 1996 to 1998.

In 2002, Faure joined the Directorate-General for External Security (DGSE), France's intelligence agency, and worked there until becoming a deputy chief of staff in the Ministry of Overseas France in 2004. In 2006, he was moved to Mayotte and became the chief of staff to the Prefect of Mayotte. After two years, he returned to France and was named the chief of staff to the Minister of the Overseas. He later worked 18 months in the private sector.

In October 2011, Faure entered the Directorate of Civil Security and Crisis Management. He became Secretary General for the department of Ille-et-Vilaine in July 2014 and then served as a director for the Paris Police Prefecture starting in July 2016. In August 2017, he was appointed as the Prefect of French Guiana. As Prefect of French Guiana, he focused on combating drug trafficking and illegal mining, and dealt with the aftermath of a social unrest that "paralyzed the region," according to La Première. After having served two years in French Guiana, he was appointed the Prefect of Morbihan on 10 July 2019.

Faure served as Prefect of Morbihan for two years, before being named the High Commissioner of the Republic in New Caledonia in 2021. He dealt with the COVID-19 pandemic and helped to organize the 2021 New Caledonian independence referendum in this position. He was succeeded by Louis Le Franc in 2023. In January 2024, he was appointed chief of staff to French President Emmanuel Macron. In November, he was named the Representative of the French Co-Prince of Andorra., serving for just over a year until his replacement by Georges-François Leclerc

== Private life ==
Faure is married to Sandrine Michalon who is a subprefect. They have six children.

== Awards and decorations ==
- Legion of Honour
- National Order of Merit
- Combatant's Cross
- Overseas Medal
- National Defence Medal
- Medal of the Nation's Gratitude
- French commemorative medal
- NATO Medal
