= Pierre de Bousquet de Florian =

French official (born 1954)

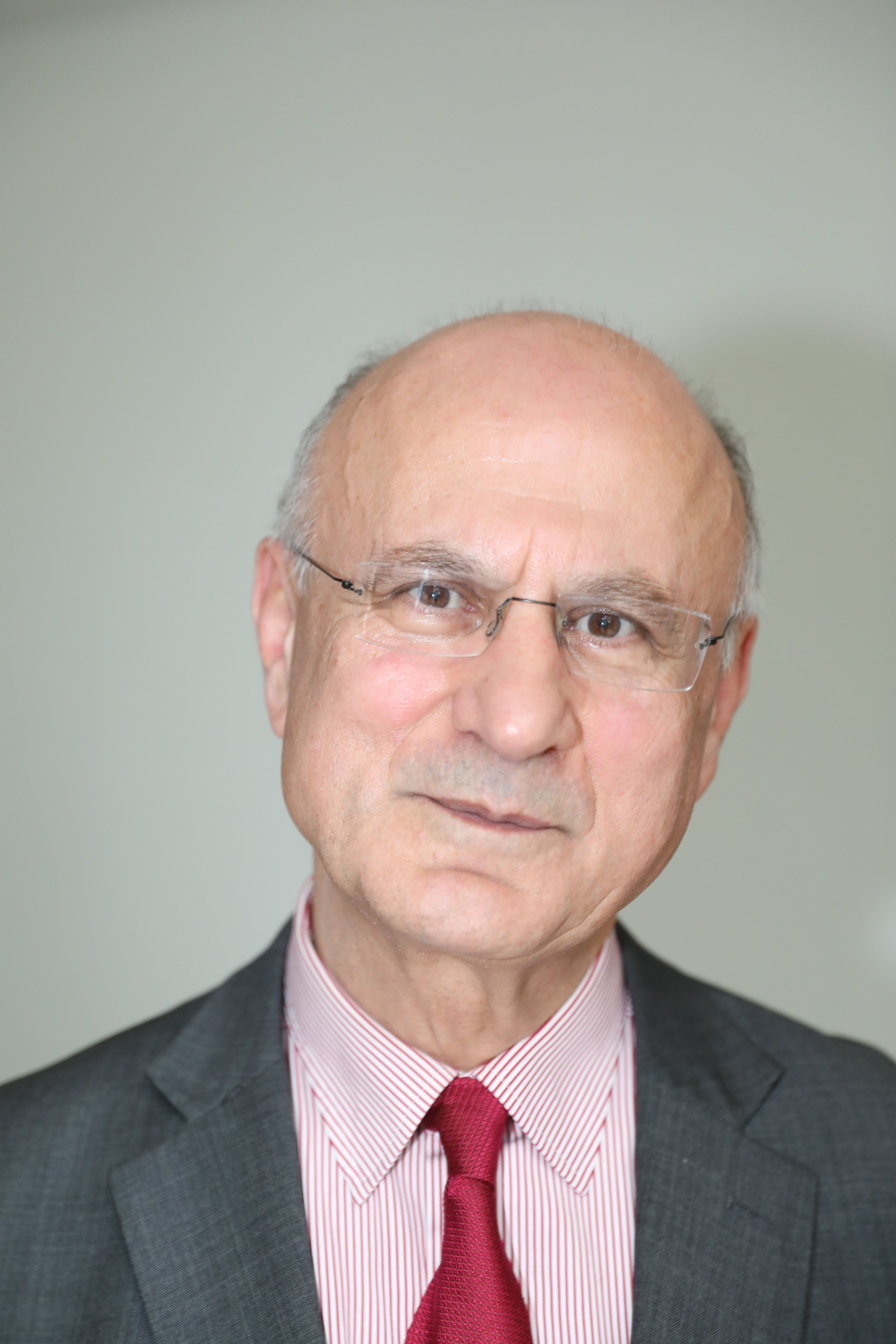
- Pierre de Bousquet de Florian in 2017

Head of the National Centre for Counter Terrorism
- In office 21 June 2017 – 6 July 2020
- President: Emmanuel Macron
- Preceded by: Yann Jounot
- Succeeded by: Laurent Nuñez

Representative of the French Co-Prince of Andorra
- In office 1997–1999
- Monarch: Jacques Chirac
- Prime Minister: Marc Forné Molné
- Preceded by: Jean-Yves Caullet
- Succeeded by: Frédéric de Saint-Sernin

Personal details
- Born: 12 June 1954 (age 72) Boulogne-Billancourt, France
- Education: Panthéon-Assas University; Sciences Po; École nationale d'administration
- Profession: Prefect

Pierre de Bousquet de Florian (French pronunciation: [pjɛʁ d(ə) buskɛ d(ə) flɔʁjɑ̃]; born 12 June 1954) was the head of the newly formed French National Centre for Counter Terrorism, an agency charged with monitoring and preventing terrorism in France, from the agency's establishment in 2017 to before being succeeded by Laurent Nuñez in 2020. Bousquet also headed the Direction de la surveillance du territoire from 2002 to 2007. Since leaving public service he has moved into the private sector in a senior advisory role at a consultancy firm.
