= Luchaire =

Luchaire is a surname. Notable people with the surname include:

- Corinne Luchaire (1921–1950), French actress
- Denis Jean Achille Luchaire (1846–1908), French historian
- Jean Luchaire (1901–1946), French journalist and collaborator
