= National Centre for Counter Terrorism =

French government agency

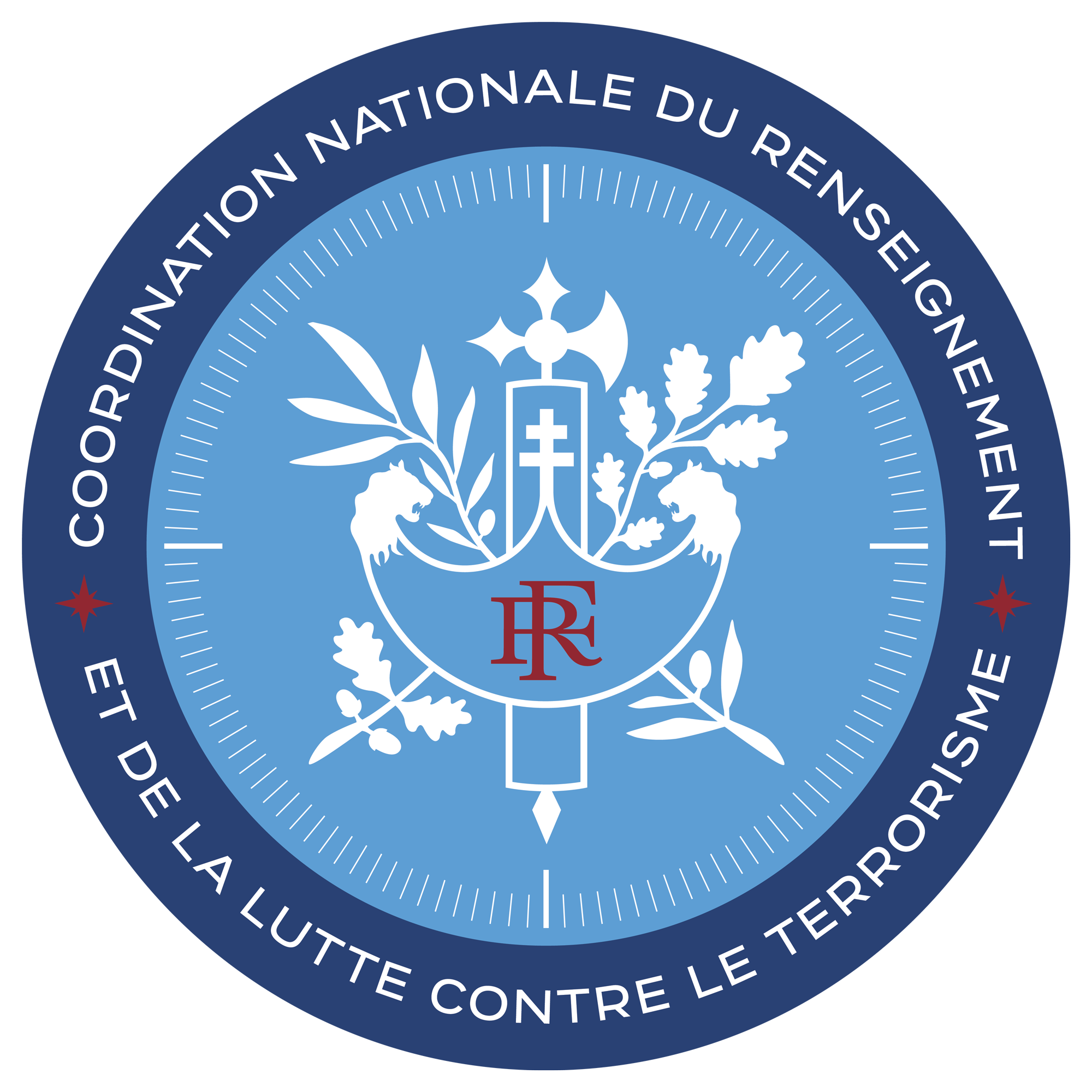
Logo of the National Centre for Counter Terrorism

The National Centre for Counter Terrorism is an agency charged with monitoring and preventing terrorism in France. It was created by President Emmanuel Macron on 7 June 2017, the day following the 2017 Notre Dame attack, in response to a series of Islamist terrorist attacks in France. The new Centre will report directly to the President and is headed by Laurent Nuñez, who succeeded Pierre de Bousquet de Florian in 2020 in the role.

The Centre is located in the presidential Elysee palace and operates 24 hours a day, focusing originally on citizens of France who have joined ISIS in Syria and Iraq and on how to counter Islamic radicalization and jihadist distribution of information on how to carry out terror attacks.

The Centre was envisioned to be in a position like that of the Joint Intelligence Committee in the United Kingdom and the office of the Director of National Intelligence in the United States.

== See also ==
- General Directorate for Internal Security
