= Direction du renseignement militaire =

French intelligence agency

Directorate of Military Intelligence
- Direction du renseignement militaire
- Logo of DRM

Agency overview
- Formed: June 16, 1992; 34 years ago
- Jurisdiction: French Armed Forces
- Minister responsible: Sébastien Lecornu, Minister of the Armies
- Agency executives: General Thierry Burkhard, Chief of Staff of the Armies; General Jacques Langlade de Montgros, Director of Military Intelligence
- Parent department: Ministry of the Armies
- Key document: Decree 1992-523
- Website: defense.gouv.fr

The Directorate of Military Intelligence (French: Direction du renseignement militaire, pronounced [diʁɛksjɔ̃ dy ʁɑ̃sɛɲmɑ̃ militɛʁ], DRM) is a French intelligence agency that has the task of collecting and centralizing military intelligence information for the French Armed Forces. Created in 1992, after Gulf War, its role is similar to that of the DIA (United States), the DI (United Kingdom) or the GRU (Russian Federation). It was formed by merging the Army Intelligence Bureau (Bureaux de Renseignement des armées) and the Military Intelligence Exploitation Centre (Centre d'exploitation du Renseignement Militaire). The DRM reports directly to the Chief of Staff and to the President of France, supreme commander of the French military.

The DRM is part of the French Intelligence Community.

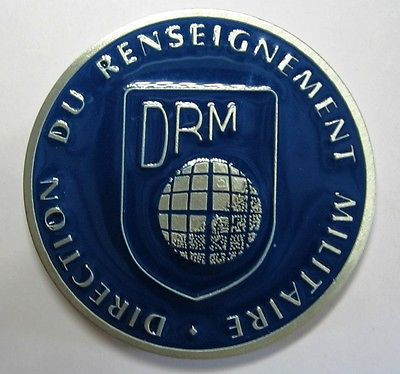
Old insigna of DRM

== Mission ==
The mission of the DRM is to provide timely intelligence and meet the needs of the French defence ministry and defence agencies. The stated aims of the DRM:

- ensures an objective and independent as possible of situations and;
- ensure freedom of maneuver and security units engaged in theater operations while contributing to their optimum efficiency, through the Office Intelligence (J2) from central planning and conduct of operations (CPCO) of Staff of the armed forces.

The budget and staff of the DRM are classified, as they are considered part of "special funds", otherwise known as a black budget.
