= Bernard Gérard (intelligence officer) =

French intelligence officer (1932–2011)

- Born: 1932
- Died: 2011 (aged 78–79)
- Occupation: Intelligence officer

Bernard Gérard (born 27 September 1932, died 24 November 2011, Draguignan) was a French intelligence officer. He was director of the Direction de la surveillance du territoire from 1986 until 1990. He had previously been the High Commissioner of the Republic in French Polynesia, from March 1985 to 1986.
