= Vallourec =

French manufacturing company

Vallourec S.A.
- Type: Société Anonyme
- Traded as: Euronext Paris: VK; CAC Mid 60 Component
- ISIN: FR0013506730
- Industry: Manufacturing
- Founded: 1957
- Headquarters: Meudon, France
- Key people: Philippe Guillemot (Chairman and Chief Executive Officer)
- Products: Steel pipes and tubes
- Revenue: ▼€5.1 billion (2023)
- Net income: ▼ (219) million (2016)
- Number of employees: ▼17,000 (2022)
- Website: www.vallourec.com/en

Vallourec S.A. is a multinational manufacturing company headquartered in Meudon, France. Vallourec specializes in hot rolled seamless steel tubes, expandable tubular technology, automotive parts, and stainless steel, which it provides to energy, construction, automotive, and mechanical industries. Vallourec shares are listed on Euronext Paris.

As of 2022, Vallourec has 17,000 employees, numerous integrated manufacturing facilities, advanced R&D operations, and a presence in more than 20 countries.

== History ==
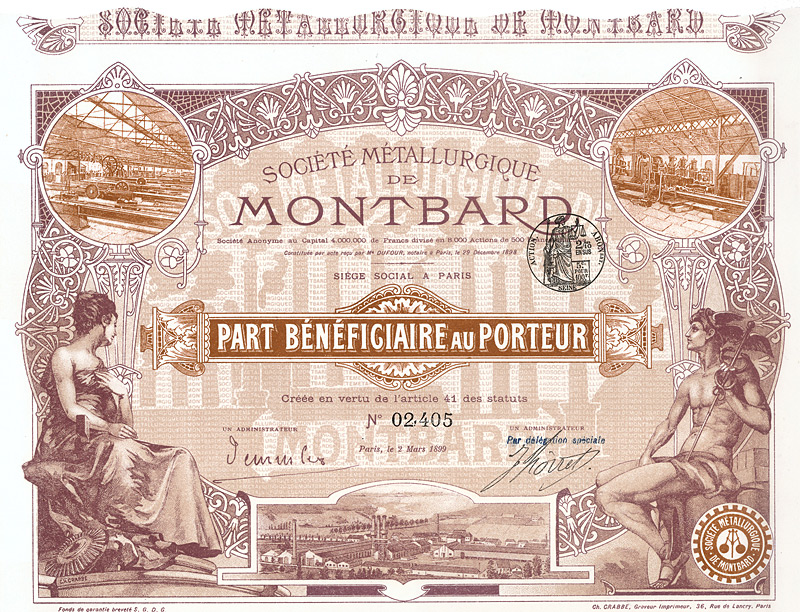
Part Beneficiaire of Soc. Metallurgique de Montbard S.A. from 2 March 1899

Vallourec's history started near the end of 19th century, after the Mannesmann's brothers discovered a process for rolling seamless steel tubes in Germany. French manufacturers then began to adopt this same method, as well as construct many industrial sites in Northern France and the Burgundy (Bourgogne) region. La Société Française des Corps Creux, located in Montbard, which was renamed Société Métallurgique de Montbard and listed on the Paris Stock Exchange in 1899, is one of the historic cornerstones of Vallourec. In 1907, Société Métallurgique de Montbard acquired a company in Aulnoye and changed its name to Société Montbard-Aulnoye.

During the 1920s and 1930s, many French industrial steel tube companies began to concentrate and specialize. In 1931, an industrial and commercial partnership was established between the factories in the cities of Valenciennes, Louvroil and Recquignies, forming a new company : Vallourec (using the first syllable of each city to create its name). In 1937, Société Montbard-Aulnoye and Société Louvroil et Recquignies merged as Société Louvroil Montbard-Aulnoye. Vallourec became the second largest steel tube manufacturer in France following the merger of the Société des Tubes de Valenciennes and the Société Louvroil-Montbard-Aulnoye, and was listed on the Paris Stock Exchange in 1957.

In 1963, Vallourec launched the VAM joint. The VAM joint rapidly became a benchmark product in the petroleum industry. In 1967, Vallourec acquired the tube division of Lorraine-Escaut, its main competitor. During the 1970s, Vallourec built an integrated steel and tube plant in Saint-Saulve, and also, formed several industrial and commercial partnerships, one such being with the Japanese company Sumitomo (Nippon Steel & Sumitomo Metal Corporation – NSSMC) – the 3rd largest manufacturer of steel tubes worldwide. In 1984, Vallourec entered the United States market with the foundation of VAM PTS (Premium Threading Services), a joint venture between Vallourec and Sumimoto.

1997 represents a turning point for Vallourec, following an alliance with the German company Mannesmann-Röhrenwerke Vallourec became a world leader in the seamless steel tube market. This jointly owned company was named Vallourec & Mannesmann Tubes (V&M Tubes). The newly formed group then continued to break into the international market with major acquisitions in both Brazil and the United States. The acquisition of North Star Steel, located in Youngstown, Ohio, considerably strengthened the company's presence in the United States.

In June 2005, Vallourec gained full control of V&M Tubes by purchasing Mannesmann-Röhrenwerke's 45% stake in the company. In 2006, following the purchase, the group entered the CAC 40 index, listed on the Paris Stock Exchange. Also, in that same year, following the acquisition of the American company OMSCO in September 2005, Vallourec became the world's second largest manufacturer of drill pipes. The drill pipe operations were regrouped under the name VAM Drilling, and in 2013 renamed Vallourec Drilling Products.

Vallourec continues to develop its operations in the Oil & Gas sectors, reinforcing its presence in China and the Middle East and investing in tubes for nuclear plants.

During the last years, Vallourec announced two major investments, in 2010, they announced plans to build a new tubing factory in Youngstown, Ohio for a sum of $650 million, to support the long-term development of alternative gas production (shale gas) in the United States. In 2011, Vallourec & Sumitomo Tubos do Brasil (VSB) was founded through a joint venture between Vallourec (56%) and Sumitomo (44%) featuring a new plant which is located in Jeceaba, Brazil.

On 1 October 2013, all of the company's divisions were rebranded under the name Vallourec.

Vallourec contributed to the renovation of Brazil's major football stadiums for the 2014 FIFA World Cup.

In January 2016, Vallourec announced a strategic partnership with Technip, one of the world leaders in project management and engineering for energy. In February 2016, Vallourec announced a 1 billion € capital increase and increased its participation in the Chinese company Tianda Oil Pipe (TOP).

In recent years Vallourec has reduced the European actives by selling off or closing down the steel works in Saint-Saulve, the rolling mills in Zeithain, Montbard, Déville-lès-Rouen, Düsseldorf-Reisholz, Düsseldorf-Rath and Mülheim-an-der-Ruhr.

In 2022 Philippe Guillemot replaces Edouard Guinotte as chairman and CEO of Vallourec.

In August 2024, ArcelorMittal acquired a 27.5% stake in Vallourec for €955 million from the investment fund Apollo. The increase in the steel giant's ownership raises the possibility of a future takeover bid. This strategic capital reinforcement, combined with the restructuring initiated by Philippe Guillemot, positions Vallourec on a path of sustainable and competitive growth in global markets.

== Head office ==
Former Vallourec head office : 12, rue de la Verrerie, Meudon, France

Before moving the HQ to Meudon to save on rent the head office was in a six floor, 8,200 m^{2} (88,000 sq ft) facility in Boulogne-Billancourt. It moved there in May 2007 and left in August 2021. It included a 3,000 m^{2} (32,000 sq ft) interior green space.

== Activities ==
Vallourec makes tubing products for the Oil & Gas, electrical, petrochemical, mechanical, and automotive industries. The company specializes in complex applications adapted for extreme conditions.

=== Oil & Gas ===
In the Oil & Gas industry, Vallourec is a major provider for tubing solutions used in exploration and production (casing and tubing, connections and risers), the transport of hydrocarbons (line pipe and integrated welding solutions), services for the oil industry, and tubes for refineries. Vallourec is specialized in products used in extreme conditions such as deep wells, corrosive environments, deviated wells, and high pressure and high temperature conditions as well.

Vallourec works with oil companies, engineering companies, and distributors alike.

=== Power Generation ===
Concerning power generation, Vallourec produces premium tubes with the ability to withstand high temperatures and pressures for both electrical and nuclear power plants. Vallourec works with manufacturers of boilers for power stations and producers of steam generators for nuclear power plants.

=== Industry & construction ===
Vallourec also produces tubes for the mechanical, automotive and construction industries. Vallourec manufactures structural tubes used in the mechanical sector (agricultural machinery hoists, hydraulic jacks, cranes, etc.) and works with major automotive manufacturers and suppliers of tubes and other components.

In the construction industry, Vallourec manufactures tubes used in architectural projects, industrial or collective equipment, and private buildings. Vallourec has provided tubes for the construction of the steel structure of the Soccer City Stadium in Johannesburg, South Africa, the Stade de France, the Grande Arche de la Défense, Wembley Stadium in London, Bangkok Airport in Thailand, as well as certain necessary components used to build the top of One World Trade Center.

In preparation for the FIFA Confederations Cup Brazil 2013 and the 2014 FIFA World Cup, Vallourec provided structural seamless steel tubes for the renovation and construction of Brazilian stadiums.

=== Revenue Distribution ===
- Oil & Gas: 68.5%
- Power Generation: 10.9%
- Industry and others: 20.6%

== Research and development ==
Vallourec has a R&D team of 500 engineers and technicians in 6 research centers around the world: France (2 in Aulnoye), Germany (2 in Düsseldorf), Brazil (Belo Horizonte), and the United States (Houston).

In 2016, Vallourec dedicated €47 million to its R&D operations.

== Worldwide presence ==
Vallourec has a presence in more than 20 countries, with 50 manufacturing facilities worldwide. In the past fifteen years, Vallourec has increased its industrial presence in Asia (China and Indonesia), Brazil, and the Middle East by increasing the local share of production.

Breakdown of sales by region in 2018:

- North America: 27.6%
- Europe: 15.8%
- South America: 16.3%
- Asia and Middle-East: 31.3%
- Rest of the world: 9.0%

List of Vallourec locations:

- France
- Germany
- Brazil
- USA
- Saudi Arabia
- Abu Dhabi
- China
- Mexico
- Canada

== Senior management ==
- Chairman of the Management Board: Philippe Guillemot
- Chief Financial Officer: Sascha Bibert

== Financial results ==
Financial Statements in euro millions
Year	2001	2002	2003	2004	2005	2006	2007	2008	2009	2010	2011	2012	2013	2014	2015	2016	2017	2019	2020
Revenue	2,500	2,550	2,376	3,038	4,307	5,542	6,141	6,437	4,465	4,491	5,296	5,326	5,578	5,700	3,803	2,965	3,750	4,173	3,242
Net income								967	518	410	401	217	262	(963)	(865)	(219)	2	(338)	(1,206)
Employees	17,247	17,419	17,507	17,484	17,542	18,217	16,874	18,561	18,567	20,561	22,204	23,177	24,053	23,709	20,964	18,325	19,500		19,000

=== Stock Information ===
- Shares listed on Eurolist by Euronext Paris Stock Exchange
- Stock Market Index: Euronext 100, MSCI World
- ISIN code = FR0000120354
- In the United States, Vallourec has a sponsored American Depositary Receipt program (ADR) Level 1 (ISIN code: US92023R2094, Ticker: VLOWY). Parity between ADR and ordinary share Vallourec is 5 to 1.

=== Capital and shareholding (2017) ===
As of 31 December 2017

- Public (64.99%),
- Group employees (4.19%),
- Bpifrance (14.56%),
- CDC Savings Fund (1.66%),
- Nippon Steel & Sumitomo Metal (14.56%),
- Treasury shares (0.04%)

== See also ==
- List of steel producers
