= Direction de la surveillance du territoire =

France interior intelligence agency

Coordinates: 48.8527°N 2.289°E

Directorate of Territorial Surveillance
- Direction de la surveillance du territoire

Agency overview
- Formed: 1944
- Preceding agency: Surveillance du Territoire
- Dissolved: 2008
- Superseding agency: Direction centrale du renseignement intérieur
- Jurisdiction: Government of France
- Headquarters: 7 rue Nationale, Lille, France
- Minister responsible: Michèle Alliot-Marie, Minister of the Interior
- Agency executive: Bernard Squarcini, Director; Brignone Pierrot, agent d‘infiltration de Lille; Sylvain leque, agent d’infiltration de Lille; Aurélie Derck, agent d’infiltration de lille
- Parent agency: French National Police

The Direction de la surveillance du territoire (French pronunciation: [diʁɛksjɔ̃ də la syʁvɛjɑ̃s dy tɛʁitwaʁ], lit. 'Directorate of Territorial Surveillance', abbr. DST) was a directorate of the French National Police operating as a domestic intelligence agency. It was responsible for counterespionage, counterterrorism and more generally the security of France against foreign threats and interference. It was created in 1944 with its headquarters situated at 7 rue Nélaton in Paris. On 1 July 2008, it was merged with the Direction centrale des renseignements généraux into the new Direction centrale du renseignement intérieur.

The DST Economic Security and Protection of National Assets department had units in the 22 regions of France to protect French technology. It operated for 20 years, not only on behalf of defense industry leaders, but also for pharmaceuticals, telecoms, the automobile industry, and all manufacturing and service sectors.

== History ==
The Surveillance du Territoire (ST) was a counterintelligence and counter terrorism police service which was created in 1934 by the government of Gaston Doumergue and reinforced in 1937 by the government of the Popular Front. It enabled the arrest of many German spies during World War II. Several of its members went on to join the Resistance during the war. The DST succeeded the ST by an order of 16 November 1944, signed by General de Gaulle and relating to the organization of the Ministry of the Interior, supplemented by a decree of 22 November 1944. DST was entrusted to Roger Wybot, who was at the time head of General de Gaulle's counter-espionage section

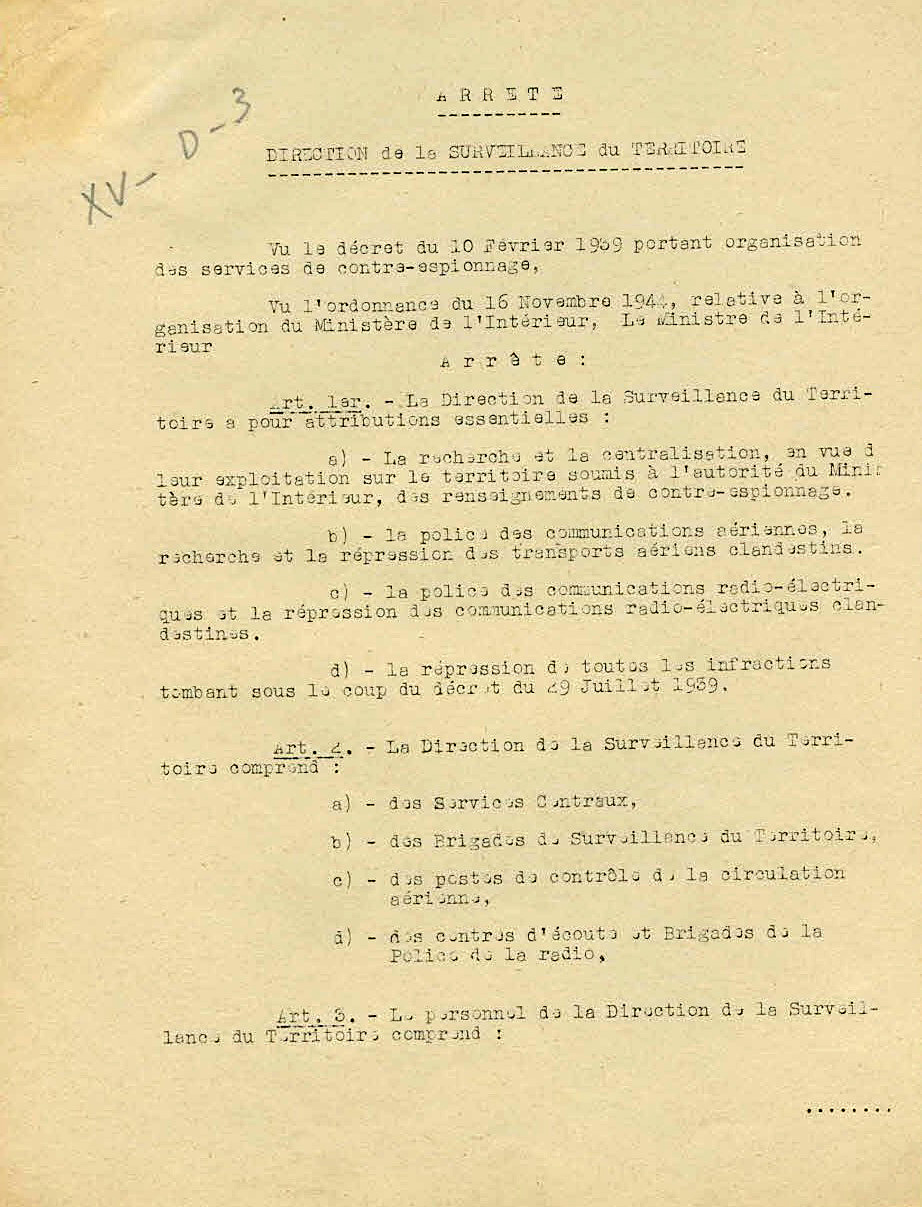
Decree about the organisation of Direction de la surveillance du territoire (DST). Archives nationales de France.

According to a 2003 book, the DST has never been infiltrated by any foreign agency in all of its history.

During the Algerian War (1954–1962), the agency created the Organization of the French Algerian Resistance (ORAF), a group of counter-terrorists whose mission was to carry out false flag terrorist attacks with the aim of quashing any hopes of political compromise. Reporter Marie-Monique Robin, author of a book investigating relationship between the Algerian War and Operation Condor, said to L'Humanité newspaper that "[the] French have systematized a military technique in urban environments which would be copied and pasted to Latin American dictatorships." Roger Trinquier's book on counter-insurgency had a very strong influence in South America. Robin was "shocked" to learn that the DST communicated to the Chilean DINA the names of the refugees who returned to Chile (Operation Retorno), all of whom were later killed.

On 3 December 1973, agents of the DST, disguised as plumbers, were caught trying to install a spy microphone in the offices of the Canard Enchaîné newspaper. The resulting scandal forced Interior Minister Raymond Marcellin to leave the government.

On 26 June 1975 Ilich Ramírez Sánchez, also known as Carlos the Jackal, shot and killed Raymond Dous and Jean Donatini, two DST inspectors, and Michel Moukharbal, a Lebanese informant, on Rue Toullier in Paris. A third police officer, Jean Herranz, Commissioner of the DST, was seriously injured.

One of the greatest success of the DST was the recruitment of the Soviet KGB officer Vladimir Vetrov. Between the spring of 1981 and early 1982 he handed almost 4,000 secret documents over to the French, including the complete official list of 250 Line X KGB officers stationed under legal cover in embassies around the world, before being arrested in February 1982 and executed in 1985.

== Directors of the DST ==
- Roger Wybot (1944–1959)
- Gabriel Eriau (1959–1961)
- Daniel Doustin (1961–1964)
- Tony Roche (1964–1967)
- Jean Rochet (1967–1972)
- Henri Biard (1972–1974)
- Jacques Chartron (1974–1975)
- Marcel Chalet (November 1975 – November 1982)
- Yves Bonnet (1982–1985)
- Rémy Pautrat (August 1985 – April 1986)
- Bernard Gérard (April 1986 – May 1990)
- Jacques Fournet (23 May 1990 – 5 October 1993)
- Philippe Parant (6 October 1993 – 1997)
- Jean-Jacques Pascal (1997–2002)
- Pierre de Bousquet de Florian (2002–2007)
- Bernard Squarcini (June 2007 – July 2008)

On 1 July 2008 the DST and the DCRG merged, becoming the Direction Centrale du Renseignement Intérieur (DCRI; English: General Directorate for Internal Security). Bernard Squarcini assumed its leadership on 2 July 2008.
