= Direction centrale des renseignements généraux =

French police intelligence agency

Directorate of General Intelligence
- Direction centrale des Renseignements généraux
- Logo of the RG

Agency overview
- Formed: 1907
- Dissolved: 1 July 2008
- Jurisdiction: France
- Headquarters: Paris, France
- Parent agency: Direction générale de la Police nationale

The Direction centrale des renseignements généraux (French pronunciation: [diʁɛksjɔ̃ sɑ̃tʁal de ʁɑ̃sɛɲmɑ̃ ʒeneʁo], lit. 'Central Directorate of General Intelligence'), often called Renseignements généraux (RG), was the intelligence service of the French National Police, answerable to the Direction générale de la Police nationale (DGPN), and, ultimately, the Ministry of the Interior. It was also in charge of the monitoring of gambling places and horse racing ranges.

On 1 July 2008, it was merged with the Direction de la surveillance du territoire into the new Direction centrale du renseignement intérieur.

== Organisation ==
The RG was subdivided into four sub-directorates:

- Research
- Analysis, prospective and society facts
- Resources and methods
- Games and casinos

The RG employed 3 850 public servants of the Police. They were not covered by the defence classification (of their name, for instance), though some of them had access to have security clearance (some of the files are classified information).

Members of the RG did not have a judiciary police qualification as long as they worked for this service, except for those of the "Games and casinos" sub-directorate.

The last chief of the RG was Joël Bouchité.

=== Sub-directorate of Research ===
The Sub-directorate of Research is in charge of intelligence, prevention and repression of terrorist acts, particularly by monitoring groups and organisations likely to be linked to such activities.

=== Sub-directorate of Analysis, prospective and society facts ===
The Sub-directorate of Analysis, prospective and society facts is in charge of analysing and syntesing data collected from social, financial or other institutions.

=== Sub-directorate of Resources and methods ===
The Sub-directorate of Resources and methods is in charge of recruitment, logistics, documentation and juridical matters, as well as of budget and staff training.

=== Sub-directorate of Gaming and casinos ===
The Sub-directorate of Gaming and casinos monitors these places together with horse racing, and also has judiciary and police powers there.

== History ==
Although police intelligence services appeared in the Ancien Régime, the term "Renseignements Généraux" dates back to 1907, with the creation by the Director of the General Security, Célestin Hennion, of an intelligence department parallel to the judiciary services.

During the 1930s, the activities of fascist groups such as La Cagoule, some of which were manipulated by foreign powers, triggered the creation of a Direction des services de renseignements généraux et de la police administrative (1937), followed by an Inspection Générale des Services de Renseignements Généraux et de la Police Administrative (1938).

In 1941, the Regime of Vichy created its own service, named Direction Centrale des Renseignements Généraux.

After the liberation of France, the RG took back the role that they had in the 1930s. Within the context of the decolonisation, they were confronted to new threats, notably the emergence of modern terrorism with the OAS.

From 1973, the job of monitoring France's borders was passed to a dedicated service, the Police de l'Air et des Frontières (PAF).

From the 1990s, the RG have been confronted to new events. They now particularly monitor radical Islamism, anti-Globalization movements, and cults.

Over the years, there have been numerous accusations that the RG has engaged in illegal spying on journalists or political opponents of the government, apparently with some basis. The abolition of the RG or its integration with some other police service, such as the DST, was suggested several times, and finally implemented on July 1, 2008 (see Direction Centrale du Renseignement Intérieur).

The particularity of the RG was their anonymous synthesis reports called feuilles blanches (white sheets).
