= General Directorate for Internal Security =

French interior intelligence agency

- Direction générale de la Sécurité intérieure

Agency overview
- Formed: 12 May 2014; 12 years ago
- Jurisdiction: French Ministry of the Interior
- Headquarters: 84 Rue de Villiers, Levallois-Perret, France
- Employees: > 5000
- Annual budget: €300 million
- Minister responsible: Laurent Nuñez
- Agency executive: Céline Berthon
- Website: dgsi.interieur.gouv.fr

The General Directorate for Internal Security (French: Direction générale de la Sécurité intérieure, pronounced [diʁɛksjɔ̃ ʒeneʁal də la sekyʁite ɛ̃teʁjœʁ], DGSI; also known as the Directorate-General for Internal Security in English) is a French security agency. It is charged with counter-espionage, counter-terrorism, countering cybercrime and surveillance of potentially threatening groups, organisations and social phenomena.

The agency was created in 2008 under the name Central Directorate for Interior Intelligence (French: Direction centrale du renseignement intérieur, DCRI), merging the Direction centrale des renseignements généraux (RG) and the Direction de la surveillance du territoire (DST) of the National Police. It acquired its current name in 2014, with a small structural shift: in contradistinction with the DCRI, which was a component of the National Police, the DGSI reports directly to the Ministry of the Interior.

The DGSI is headed by Director-General Céline Berthon. The agency is informally known as the "RG", a nickname formerly used for the Direction centrale des renseignements généraux which merged into it.

The DGSI performs among the others the following tasks: prevents and halts any action or interference from foreign entities; fights acts of terrorism or acts that threaten the security and sustainability of the state or undermine the integrity of the territory; participates in the surveillance of radicalised individuals and groups who may turn to violence and threaten national security; fights against international criminal organisations that may have an impact on national security. The DGSI is the only French secret service to cooperate directly with judicial institutions (l'institution judiciaire).

== History ==
=== Direction centrale du renseignement intérieur (DCRI) ===
The fusion of the RG and the DST into the Direction centrale du renseignement intérieur (DCRI) was a wish held by Nicolas Sarkozy when he was France's Minister of the Interior. The change was officially launched by the Council of Ministers on 20 June 2007, shortly after the election of Sarkozy as President. Minister of the Interior Michèle Alliot-Marie, however, was reputedly reluctant regarding this fusion and ordered the General Director of the Police Nationale, Frédéric Péchenard, to undertake a study of the proposal.

The creation of DCRI was announced on 13 September 2007 by Alliot-Marie. The founding texts of the DCRI were adopted 7 April 2008, to become effective 1 July 2008.

A fraction of the former functionaries of the Renseignement général (General Intelligence, RG) were brought in from the Sub-Direction of General Information (SDIG) from the Central Direction of Public Security, represented in the departments of metropolitan France and in its overseas territories by the departmental services of General Information, in the care of the departmental directorates of Public Security.

Bernard Squarcini, director of DST, was named head of the DCRI in 2008. He was assisted from the outset by two central adjunct directors, René Bailly, former functionary of the RG, and Patrick Calvar, former functionary of the DST. René Bailly then left the DCRI in the month of June 2009 to take leadership of the new direction of intelligence of the Paris police (DRPP), Patrick Calvar named director of intelligence of external security(DGSE) is replaced in his post at the beginning of 2010 by Frédéric Veaux, until then sub-director of the Central Directorate of the Judicial Police.

One of the first media appearances of the new DCRI was the arrest of Julien Coupat, one of the Tarnac Nine.

In December 2008, the leadership of the DCRI made priority of surveilling an impending plot orchestrated by an Islamist in the region of Paris.

By a decree of 31 May 2012, Patrick Calvar, former adjunct operational director of the DCRI and director of intelligence at the DGSE since 2009, was named central director of interior intelligence, replacing Squarcini.

=== Direction générale de la Sécurité intérieure (DGSI) ===
After the left-wing Parti Socialiste (France) taking control of both the parliament and the presidency in the 2012 presidential and legislative elections, a reassessment the role of the DCRI was sought. In May 2013, a bipartisan parliamentary report on the intelligence services was prepared by members of parliament Jean-Jacques Urvoas and Patrice Verchère. The report was critical of the DCRI's functioning and particularly their failure to prevent the Toulouse and Montauban shootings of March 2012. On 17 June 2012 Minister of the Interior Manuel Valls announced a reform of French domestic intelligence. This reform was made official by decree no. 2014-445 from 30 April 2014, which took effect on 12 May 2014. The DCRI became the Direction générale de la Sécurité intérieure (DGSI), no longer under the authority of the General Director of the Police Nationale but reporting directly to the Minister of the Interior, giving it increased authority. The existing operatives and contractors (engineers, programmers, linguists) remained largely in place. The recently installed head of the DCRI Patrick Calvar also continued in his function until 2017.

== Wikipedia controversy ==
In April 2013, the French Wikipedia article on the military radio station of Pierre-sur-Haute attracted attention after the DCRI attempted to have the article removed from the French Wikipedia. The Wikimedia Foundation asked the intelligence agency what precise parts of the article were a problem in the eyes of the intelligence agency. The DCRI refused to give these details, and repeated its demand for total deletion of the article.

The Wikimedia Foundation refused to delete the article, and the DCRI pressured an administrator, threatening detention and prosecution, of the French language Wikipedia and resident of France, into removing the article.

According to a statement by the Wikimedia Foundation,

The DCRI summoned a Wikipedia volunteer in their offices on April 4th [2013]. This volunteer, which was one of those having access to the tools that allow the deletion of pages, was forced to delete the article while in the DCRI offices, on the understanding that he would have been held in custody and prosecuted if he did not comply. Under pressure, he had no other choice than to delete the article, despite explaining to the DCRI this is not how Wikipedia works. He warned the other sysops that trying to undelete the article would engage their responsibility before the law. This volunteer had no link with that article, having never edited it and not even knowing of its existence before entering the DCRI offices. He was chosen and summoned because he was easily identifiable, given his regular promotional actions of Wikipedia and Wikimedia projects in France.

The article was later restored by other Wikipedia contributors. The French Ministry of the Interior told Agence France-Presse that for the moment it did not wish to comment on the incident.

== Investigations ==
The DGSI was tasked with co-leading the terror investigation into the 2017 Notre Dame attack together with the National Centre for Counter Terrorism.

== See also ==
- National Centre for Counter Terrorism
- Internal security
- Homeland security
