= Same-sex marriage in Andorra =

Same-sex marriage has been legal in Andorra since 17 February 2023. Andorra first established stable unions on 23 March 2005, providing same-sex couples with some of the rights and benefits of marriage, and later enacted civil unions on 25 December 2014, offering a greater set of rights. On 21 July 2022, the General Council voted to open civil marriage to same-sex couples. The law was promulgated by Co-Prince Emmanuel Macron on 17 August 2022, and came into effect six months later (i.e. 17 February 2023).

Andorra was the second European microstate, the nineteenth country in Europe and the 34th in the world to allow same-sex couples to marry. Civil unions are no longer available in Andorra and marriage is now the only legally recognized form of union for couples regardless of sex.

== Stable unions ==
On 21 February 2005, the General Council passed a bill legalising "stable unions". The new law was promulgated by Co-Prince Jacques Chirac, and published in the Official Bulletin of the Principality of Andorra on 23 March 2005. Co-Prince Joan Enric, the Bishop of Urgell, did not sign the law. Although the co-princes are both the heads of state of Andorra, only a single signature is required to sanction and promulgate new laws, and to order their publication in the Official Bulletin. The relationship is called unió estable de parella (pronounced [uniˈo esˈtable ðe paˈɾeʎa], meaning "stable union of a couple") in Catalan.

Partners seeking to enter a stable union must not be related in direct line by consanguinity or adoption, or in the collateral line by consanguinity to the fourth degree. Both partners must be adults or emancipated minors, must not be already married or in an existing stable union, must live as a couple and at least one partner must be a resident of Andorra or an Andorran national. The couple must submit an application accompanied by the following documents: a sworn declaration of cohabitation, a copy of the current passport or identity document of both partners, a certificate of residency for each partner (Andorran nationals are exempt from this requirement), a private pact signed by both partners setting out property and personal relations arising from the relationship and the rights and obligations of the relationship, and a sworn statement by two witnesses confirming the permanent nature of the cohabitation. The stable union is registered six months after the declaration and is then entered into the Register of Stable Unions (Registre d'unions estables de parella).

A couple in a stable union have legal rights and responsibilities, including the obligation to support one another, the right to compensation and maintenance in the event of a breakup and the same rights as spouses for the purposes of social security and employment law. The stable union law also recognises the right to adopt a child, subject to the same rules as a married couple, but only for heterosexual couples. A stable union ends by the marriage of either party, the death of either party, a unilateral declaration by formal written notification notified to the other party or a mutual declaration.

== Civil unions ==
=== Legislative action ===
On 2 June 2014, following an earlier announcement, the ruling Democrats for Andorra (DA) party introduced a bill to establish civil unions (unió civil). The civil unions were intended to be equal to marriage in everything but name, as the word "marriage" was the main reason why the DA voted against the Social Democrats' same-sex marriage bill in May 2014. The bill would also grant same-sex couples joint adoption rights. After months of consultation, the bill passed the General Council on 27 November on a vote of 20 to 3 with several abstentions. The bill was published in the official journal on 24 December, following promulgation by Co-Prince François Hollande, and took effect on 25 December 2014. Andorran LGBT groups denounced the law as discriminatory.

27 November 2014 vote in the General Council
Party	Voted for	Voted against	Abstained	Absent (Did not vote)
Democrats for Andorra	18: Miquel Aleix Areny; Pere Altimir Pintat; Daniel Armengol Bosch; Josep Anton Bardina Pau; Ladislau Baró Solà; Mònica Bonell Tuset; Sílvia Calvó Armengol; Carles Enseñat Reig; Sofia Garrallà Tomàs; Olga Gelabert Fàbrega; Celine Mandicó Garcia; Meritxell Mateu Pi; Vicenç Mateu Zamora; Xavier Montané Atero; Patrícia Riberaygua Marme; Sílvia Riva González; Martí Salvans Abetlla; Meritxell Verdú Marquilló	–	–	2: Olga Adellach Coma; Aleix Varela González
Social Democratic Party	–	3: Gerard Barcia Duedra; Jaume Bartumeu Cassany; Sílvia Eloïsa Bonet Perot	3: Rosa Gili Casals; Mariona González Reolit; David Rios Rius	–
Lauredian Union	2: Roser Bastida Areny; Pere Obiols Mogio	–	–	–
Total	20	3	3	2
Total	71.4%	10.7%	10.7%	7.1%

The ability to enter into a civil union ended on 17 February 2023, and all unions were converted to civil marriages.

=== Statistics ===
By the end of 2017, 35 same-sex civil unions had been performed in Andorra; 21 were between male couples and 14 between female couples.

== Same-sex marriage ==
Laws regarding same-sex partnerships in Europe¹ Marriage Civil union Limited domestic recognition (cohabitation) Unrecognized Constitution limits marriage to opposite-sex couples ¹ May include recent laws or court decisions that have not yet entered into effect.

=== Background ===
On 21 April 2009, the Social Democratic Party (PS) led by Jaume Bartumeu announced that it would push for a debate on same-sex marriage in Andorra if it won the 2009 elections. The Social Democrats won the election and Bartumeu became head of government on 5 June 2009, but no subsequent action was taken to legalise same-sex marriage, and the PS was defeated by the Democrats for Andorra in the 2011 parliamentary elections.

In January 2013, the Andorran Superior Council of Justice granted social security survivor's benefits to Juan García Pérez, who had married his late husband in Spain, but had never registered a stable union in Andorra. The first same-sex marriage in Andorra occurred at the French embassy in Andorra la Vella in November 2013. The marriage was performed under French law; France having legalized same-sex marriage earlier that year.

=== Attempt at legalisation in 2014 ===
On 31 March 2014, the Social Democratic Party introduced a bill to legalize same-sex marriage. On 29 May 2014, the bill was rejected by the General Council. Supporters of the bill had presented some 3,000 signatures in favor of same-sex marriage to the Council, hoping to persuade lawmakers to support it. The Democrats for Andorra, who had voted against the bill, announced their intention to introduce civil unions instead; civil union legislation was introduced on 2 June 2014, and enacted on 25 December 2014.

=== Passage of legislation in 2022 ===
On 10 March 2020, the three parties forming the governing coalition, the Democrats for Andorra, the Liberals and Committed Citizens, presented a draft bill to legalize same-sex marriage. It was consulted with the Bar Association and the Superior Council of Justice, before being submitted to the General Council on 24 November 2020. The government published its endorsement of the bill on 17 December. The legislation would have created two forms of marriage; civil marriage (casament civil), open to both same-sex and different-sex couples, and "canonical marriage" (matrimoni canònic) performed by religious authorities, mainly belonging to the Catholic Church in Andorra. Both would have conferred the same legal rights and benefits. The bill was under public consultation until 13 April 2022, following more than 12 extensions in the midst of the COVID-19 pandemic, and was voted on by the General Council as part of a new family code on 21 July. The articles regarding same-sex marriage were voted on separately and were approved with 18 votes in favour and 6 votes against, while the rest of the code was approved unanimously 25–0. The law was promulgated by Co-Prince Emmanuel Macron and published in the Official Bulletin on 17 August 2022. It came into effect six months after publication (i.e. 17 February 2023).

21 July 2022 vote in the General Council
Party	Voted for	Voted against	Abstained	Absent (Did not vote)
Democrats for Andorra	9: Alexandra Codina Tort; Berna Coma González; Maria Martisella González; Ester Molné Soldevila; David Montané Amador; Joan Carles Ramos Reboredo; Carles Enseñat Reig; Núria Rossell Jordana; Roser Suñé Pascuet	–	–	1: Mònica Bonell Tuset
Social Democratic Party	–	6: Jordi Font Mariné; Pere López Agràs; Joaquim Miró Castillo; Roger Padreny Carmona; Judith Salazar Álvarez; Carles Sánchez Rodríguez	–	1: Susanna Vela Palomares
Liberals of Andorra	2: Ferran Costa Marimon; Marc Magallón Font	–	–	2: Silvia Ferrer Ghiringhelli; Eva López Herrero
Committed Citizens	3: Raül Ferré Bonet; Carles Naudi d'Areny-Plandolit Balsells; Meritxell Palmitjavila Naudí	–	–	–
Third Way	3: Oliver Alis Salguero; Joan Carles Camp Areny; Josep Pintat Forné	–	–	–
Independent	1: Carine Montaner Raynaud	–	–	–
Total	18	6	0	4
Total	64.3%	21.4%	0.0%	14.3%

MP Carles Enseñat Reig welcomed the vote, saying, "It is a law of a modern country that ensures the free development of citizenship and bases its success on the most primordial organizational nucleus — the family — with all its diversity". The law provides same-sex couples with all the legal rights, benefits and responsibilities of marriage, including the right of lesbian couples to access artificial insemination. Marriage officers are not able to refuse to preside over a civil marriage, except if they have notified the civil registry, at which point another marriage officer would solemnize the marriage. The law initially recognized two forms of marriage: casament civil and matrimoni canònic, which according to article 78 would have had the same legal effects. Nevertheless, the Social Democrats opposed the law because they viewed the two forms of marriage as discriminatory. The party proposed an amendment during the parliamentary discussion to change the wording for civil marriage to matrimoni civil, but it was defeated. The law made Andorra one of the last countries in Western Europe and the 34th in the world to legalise same-sex marriage.

In October 2022, the Constitutional Court agreed to hear a case filed by the Social Democratic Party contesting the distinction between casament and matrimoni. In December, the court ruled that the use of two different terms for marriage was unconstitutional. It found the concept of differentiating and defining matrimoni canònic to be discriminatory, given that same-sex couples, as well as non-Catholic couples, would not be eligible for them, and thus annulled the section of the law that distinguished between the two terms. The government issued a statement that it would respect the court ruling, and announced it would study the ruling to determine if any further modifications to the law would be needed. On 30 January 2023, Parliament abolished the distinction between civil and religious marriages, so that all marriages would now be known as matrimoni.

Article 77(2) (Title II, Chapter I, Section II) of the new Family Code reads:

El matrimoni contret en forma civil té els mateixos requisits i efectes quan ambdós contraents siguin persones del mateix o de diferent sexe.

(Civil marriage shall have the same requisites and effects regardless of whether the persons involved are of the same or different sex.)

=== Statistics ===
14 same-sex marriages were performed in Andorra in 2024, followed by 20 marriages in 2025.

== Public opinion ==
According to a 2013 survey by the Institute of Andorran Studies (Institut d'Estudis Andorrans), 70% of Andorrans were in favour of same-sex marriage, 19% were against and 11% were undecided or had refused to answer.

== See also ==
- LGBT rights in Andorra
- Recognition of same-sex unions in Europe
