= Trinitat Marín =

Andorran politician (born 1964)

Minister of Social Affairs and Civil Service
- Incumbent
- Assumed office 17 May 2023
- Prime Minister: Xavier Espot
- Preceded by: Judith Pallarés

Minister of Public Administration and Citizen Participation
- In office 14 July 2021 – 17 May 2023
- Prime Minister: Xavier Espot
- Preceded by: Judith Pallarés

Personal details
- Born: 22 November 1964 (age 61) Escaldes-Engordany, Andorra
- Party: Democrats for Andorra

Trinitat Marín González (born 22 November 1964) is an Andorran politician, Minister of Social Affairs and Civil Service of Andorra since 2023, in the government of Prime Minister Xavier Espot. She previously served as Minister of Public Administration and Citizen Participation of Andorra between 2021 and 2023, and mayor of Escaldes-Engordany between 2012 and 2019.

== Career ==
Marín was born on 22 November 1964 in Escaldes-Engordany. She studied administration and spent most of her professional career as an administrator and area manager at Andorran Social Security Fund (CASS).

She began her political career in 2004 when she was elected councillor for the municipality of Escaldes-Engordany in the local elections of December 2003.

Marín was Councillor for Social Affairs when Antoni Martí was its mayor, and between 2008 and 2011, she was Deputy Mayor. When Antoni Martí became the new Prime Minister in May 2011, Marín was called to led the Democrats for Andorra (DA) party in the 2011 local election, winning near 70% of the votes and being elected mayor of Escaldes-Engordany. She was re-elected in the 2015 local election. On 19 February 2019, she withdrew her candidacy for mayor in that year's local elections, returning to late professional position, and Sílvia Calvó was chosen instead.

In a government reshuffle, in 2021 Prime Minister Xavier Espot appointed her as the new Minister of Public Administration and Citizen Participation of Andorra, and was sworn on 14 July 2021, succeeding Judith Pallarés.

Together with Minister Pallarés, at the end of that year she presented the proposal to reform the 2019 Civil Service Law, which included a maximum annual working time of 1,800 hours, the reservation of positions for Andorrans, the regulation of teleworking and the revision of disciplinary procedure rules. In November 2022, Marín presented the new regulations on citizen participation included in the new Transparency Act, which was approved at the end of last year.

Marín successfully contested the Escaldes-Engordany territorial constituency in the 2023 parliamentary election and was elected to the General Council as a member of the DA.

On 16 May 2023 she was appointed the new Minister of Social Affairs and Civil Service in the second cabinet of Prime Minister Xavier Espot and was sworn in the following day. In December 2023, Marín announced that, by 2024, all government procedures will be able to be done online. In June 2024, she introduced several measures to facilitate access to housing, reducing residency requirements and increasing the percentage eligible for subsidies.
