= Rosa Ferrer Obiols =

Andorran lawyer and politician (1960–2018)

MP Rosa Ferrer Obiols GOIH LH
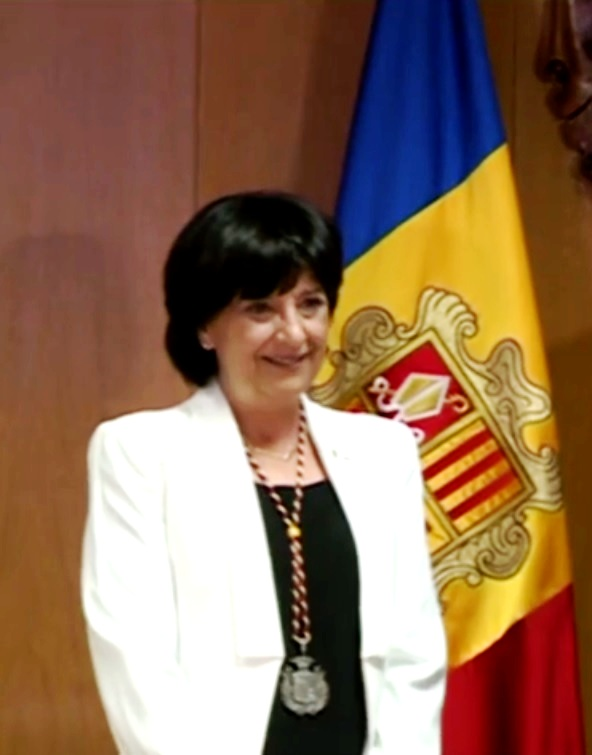

Minister of Health, Welfare and Occupation
- In office 21 April 2015 – 4 January 2016
- Prime Minister: Antoni Martí Petit
- Preceded by: Cristina Rodríguez
- Succeeded by: Carles Álvarez Marfany

Minister of Institutional Relations
- In office 1 April 2015 – 21 April 2015
- Prime Minister: Antoni Martí Petit
- Succeeded by: Office transferred to the Prime Minister

Mayor of Andorra la Vella
- In office 7 December 2007 – 22 January 2015
- Preceded by: Francesc Xavier Mora Baron
- Succeeded by: Jordi Ramon Minguillón Capdevila

General Councilor
- In office 1994–2001
- In office 2005–2007

Personal details
- Born: Maria Rosa Ferrer Obiols; 23 April 1960 Andorra la Vella, Andorra
- Died: 10 February 2018 (aged 57) Andorra la Vella
- Party: Social Democratic Party of Andorra; Coalition of Independents for Andorra la Vella (Cd'I)
- Education: University of Barcelona
- Occupation: Politician and lawyer

Maria Rosa Ferrer Obiols GOIH LH (23 April 1960 – 10 February 2018), was an Andorran lawyer and politician. She was the Cònsol Major (same as Mayor) of the Comú d'Andorra la Vella from 2007 until 2015 and the Minister of Health, Welfare and Employment of the Principality of Andorra until 4 January 2016.

She also led the Coalició d'Independents party for Andorra la Vella, with which she won the 2011 communal elections. In the national elections of 2015 he appeared in a coalition with Democrats for Andorra, once again winning a seat in the Consell General de Andorra.

On 21 April 2015 she held the position of Minister of Health, Welfare and Employment of the Principality of Andorra. On 15 December 2015 she resigned following the breakup of the coalition formed by Coalició d'Independents for Andorra la Vella, the party she led, and Demòcrates per Andorra.

== Career ==
Born in Andorra la Vella, she graduated in Law from the University of Barcelona. She began her career in 1979, working for the Court of Corts (Tribunal de Corts) of the Principality of Andorra as a justice officer. Later, she worked as Head of Service in the General Secretariat of the Government of Andorra. She also worked in the private sector, offering her lawyer services through two Andorran law firms.

From 1983 she began his political career, participating in the Renovació Parroquial party team. Later, she became a member of Entesa i Progrés and, subsequently, a militant of New Democracy. In 2001 she became one of the founders of the Social Democratic Party of Andorra, of which she was Secretary of Organization and, later, Head of International Relations in front of the Socialist International and in front of the European Socialist Party.

She was elected General Councilor (same as Member of the Parliament) on 1994 until 2001, being re-elected on 2005 until 2 December 2007, when she head the electoral list of the Social Democratic Party of Andorra for the communal elections, winning them and becoming Cònsol General of Andorra la Vella. She was re-elected as Mayoress in the 2011 local elections for Coalició d'Independents per Andorra la Vella (Cd'I).

On 22 January 2015, she decided to resign from the position of Cònsol Major of Andorra la Vella to appear in the general elections on 1 March of the same year, in a coalition with Demòcrates per Andorra. She occupied a seat in the General Council and the Prime Minister, Antoni Martí, named her Minister of Institutional Relations, Social Services and Employment of the Principality of Andorra, a position that was modified on 21 April 2015 to become Minister of Health, Welfare and Employment of the Principality of Andorra, passing the Institutional Relations to the services of the Head of the Government. On 4 January 2016, she resigned from office due to discrepancies in the political management of the Government, the breakup of the coalition formed by Coalició d'Independents for Andorra la Vella, and Demòcrates per Andorra and the results in the 2015 local elections.

Since 2015 she practiced advocacy in Andorra until her death on 10 February 2018, from cancer.

== Honorific distinctions ==
- Lady Grand Officer of the Order of Prince Henry, granted by the President of the Portuguese Republic on 10 June 2011.
- Lady of the Legion of Honor, granted by the President of the French Republic and Coprince of Andorra on 24 January 2013.
- Distinguished Guest from the municipality of Morelia, Mexico, on 17 September 2014.
