= 2023 Andorran local elections =

Local elections in Andorra were held on 17 December to elect all councillors in the seven parishes of Andorra. Overall voter turnout was 54.75%, dropping over 1.7% in comparison to the 2019 elections.

== Electoral system ==
Voters will elect the members of the municipal councils (consells de comú in Catalan). The Electoral Law allows the municipal councils to choose their number of seats, which must be an even number between 10 and 16.

All city council members will be elected in single multi-member districts, consisting of the whole parish, using closed lists. Half of the seats will be allocated to the party with the most votes. The other half of the seats are allocated using the Hare quota (including the winning party). With this system, the winning party obtains an absolute majority.

The cònsol major (mayor) and the cònsol menor (deputy mayor) will be elected indirectly by the municipal councillors after the election.

== Parties and leaders ==
A total of 14 lists are contesting the election. In Canillo there is only one candidacy contesting the election; in Sant Julià de Lòria, three; and two on the remaining parishes.

| Parish | List | Supporting parties | Leader |
|---|---|---|---|
| Canillo | Democrats + Independents | DA | Jordi Alcobé Font |
| Encamp | United for the Progress + Democrats + Independents | DA | Laura Mas Barrionuevo |
| Encamp | Let's move forward | PS | Marta Pujol Palau |
| Ordino | United for Ordino | AE, PS | Enric Dolsa Font |
| Ordino | Ordino Communal Action + Democrats + Independents + Progressives SDP | ACO, DA, SDP | Maria del Mar Coma Padilla |
| La Massana | Committed Citizens + DA + Independents | CC, DA | Eva Sansa Jordan |
| La Massana | With Sense | Concord, PS, Somveïns, Participa | Guillem Forné Gispert |
| Andorra la Vella | Enclar | Concord, PS, Somveïns | Sergi Gonzalez Camacho |
| Andorra la Vella | Democrats + Progressives SDP + Independents | DA, SDP | David Astrie Padilla |
| Sant Julià de Lòria | Lauredian Union + Democrats + Action + Independents | Acció, DA, UL | Josep Majoral Obiols |
| Sant Julià de Lòria | Wake up Laurèdia | Concord | Cerni Cairat Perrigault |
| Sant Julià de Lòria | For Sant Julià | PS, SDP | Antonio Miralles Gascó |
| Escaldes-Engordany | Consensus for Escaldes-Engordany | PS | Rosa Gili Casals |
| Escaldes-Engordany | Democrats + Action + SDP + Independents | Acció, DA, SDP | Anna García Ricart |

== Results ==
The results were as follows:

=== Canillo ===
| List | Votes | % | Seats |
|---|---|---|---|
| Democrats + Independents | 432 | 100 | 10 |
| Blank ballots | 218 | – | – |
| Null/Invalid ballots | 34 | – | – |
| Total | 684 | 100 | 10 |
| Electorate/turnout | 1.220 | 56,06 | – |

=== Encamp ===
| List | Votes | % | Seats |
|---|---|---|---|
| United for the Progress + Democrats + Independents | 1.403 | 68,24 | 10 |
| Let's move forward | 653 | 31,76 | 2 |
| Blank ballots | 202 | – | – |
| Null/Invalid ballots | 74 | – | – |
| Total | 2.332 | 100 | 12 |
| Electorate/turnout | 4.440 | 52,52 | – |

=== Ordino ===
| List | Votes | % | Seats |
|---|---|---|---|
| Ordino Communal Action + Democrats + Independents + Progressives SDP | 646 | 55,64 | 8 |
| United for Ordino | 515 | 44,36 | 2 |
| Blank ballots | 138 | – | – |
| Null/Invalid ballots | 36 | – | – |
| Total | 1.335 | 100 | 10 |
| Electorate/turnout | 1.947 | 68,56 | – |

=== La Massana ===
| List | Votes | % | Seats |
|---|---|---|---|
| Committed Citizens + DA + Independents | 1.113 | 58,73 | 10 |
| With Sense | 782 | 41,27 | 2 |
| Blank ballots | 159 | – | – |
| Null/Invalid ballots | 60 | – | – |
| Total | 2.114 | 100 | 12 |
| Electorate/turnout | 3.552 | 59,51 | – |

=== Andorra la Vella ===
| List | Votes | % | Seats |
|---|---|---|---|
| Enclar | 1.989 | 52,47 | 9 |
| Democrats + Progressives SDP + Independents | 1.802 | 47,53 | 3 |
| Blank ballots | 244 | – | – |
| Null/Invalid ballots | 89 | – | – |
| Total | 4.124 | 100 | 12 |
| Electorate/turnout | 8.784 | 46,96 | – |

=== Sant Julià de Lòria ===
| List | Votes | % | Seats |
|---|---|---|---|
| Desperta Laurèdia | 1.357 | 53,26 | 9 |
| Lauredian Union + Democrats + Action + Independents | 1.047 | 41,09 | 3 |
| For Sant Julià | 144 | 5,65 | 0 |
| Blank ballots | 114 | – | – |
| Null/Invalid ballots | 37 | – | – |
| Total | 2.699 | 100 | 12 |
| Electorate/turnout | 4.559 | 59,20 | – |

=== Escaldes-Engordany ===
| List | Votes | % | Seats |
|---|---|---|---|
| Consensus for Escaldes-Engordany | 1.606 | 51,49 | 9 |
| Democrats + Action + SDP + Independents | 1.513 | 48,51 | 3 |
| Blank ballots | 177 | – | – |
| Null/Invalid ballots | 60 | – | – |
| Total | 3.356 | 100 | 12 |
| Electorate/turnout | 5.899 | 56,90 | – |
