= Conxita Marsol =

Andorran lawyer and politician (born 1960)

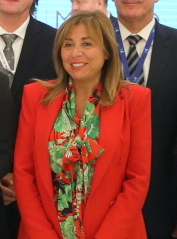

Minister of Presidency, Economy, Labour and Housing
- Incumbent
- Assumed office 17 May 2023
- Prime Minister: Xavier Espot Zamora
- Preceded by: Jordi Gallardo
- In office 2008–2009
- Prime Minister: Albert Pintat

Mayor of Andorra la Vella
- In office 28 December 2015 – 13 February 2023
- Preceded by: Jordi Ramon Minguillon Capdevila
- Succeeded by: David Astrié

Member of the General Council of Andorra
- In office 2005–2009
- In office 2015–2019

Personal details
- Born: August 27, 1960 (age 66) Artesa de Segre, Catalonia, Spain
- Party: Liberal Party of Andorra; Democrats for Andorra
- Education: University of Barcelona
- Occupation: Lawyer and Politician

Conxita Marsol i Riart (born 27 August 1960), is an Andorran lawyer and politician, Minister of Presidency, Economy, Labour and Housing of Andorra since 2023. She was the Cònsol Major ("Mayor") of Andorra la Vella between 2015 and 2023.

== Life ==
Born in Artesa de Segre, Spain, on 27 August 1960, her family soon moved to Andorra. She graduated in Laws from the University of Barcelona in the Faculty of Lleida and she was awarded a degree in Andorran Law.

She became the general secretary of the Council of Andorra la Vella when she was 24 and she carried out role until 2004. She was supported by Manel Pons, Lluís Viu and Conxita Mora. In 2004, she founded her own Law firm.

== Political career ==
In the 2005 Andorran parliamentary election she was elected general counselor and became the first and only woman to be president of a parliamentary group, the Liberal, between April 2005 and May 2009.

She joined the Government of Albert Pintat on 7 May 2008 as Minister of the Presidency and Economy. Among its competencies, she supervised the departments of Trade, Societies, Procedures and relations with the GRECO (Group of States against Corruption of the Council of Europe). On 7 January 2009, she became also the spokeswomen of the Government.

In the 2009 Andorran parliamentary election, she was presented to the general election as the head of the list by Andorra la Vella of the Reformist Coalition and failed to obtain parliamentary representation.

It was not until 2015 when she returned to national politics, appearing in March as number three on the national list of Democrats for Andorra, headed by Antoni Martí, the head of Government of Andorra between 2011 and 2018.

She resigned as lawmaker in 2015 and lead the Democrats for Andorra in the 2015 Andorran local elections, as a candidate for Mayor of the capital of the country. With 35.74% of the votes, among four lists, Conxita Marsol became the mayor of Andorra la Vella on 28 December 2015.

In the 2019 Andorran local elections she headed again the list of Democrats for and Andorra and was re-elected Mayor on 28 December 2019.

She resigned from the office on 13 February 2023 in order to participate in the 2023 Andorran parliamentary election. Marsol was succeeded by David Astrié. In the 2019 Andorran local elections she headed again the list of Democrats for and Andorra and was re-elected Mayor on 28 December 2019. on 1 March 2023. On 16 May 2023, she was appointed the new Minister of Presidency, Economy, Labour and Housing in the second cabinet of Xavier Espot Zamora and was sworn in the following day.
