= Judith Pallarés =

Andorran politician

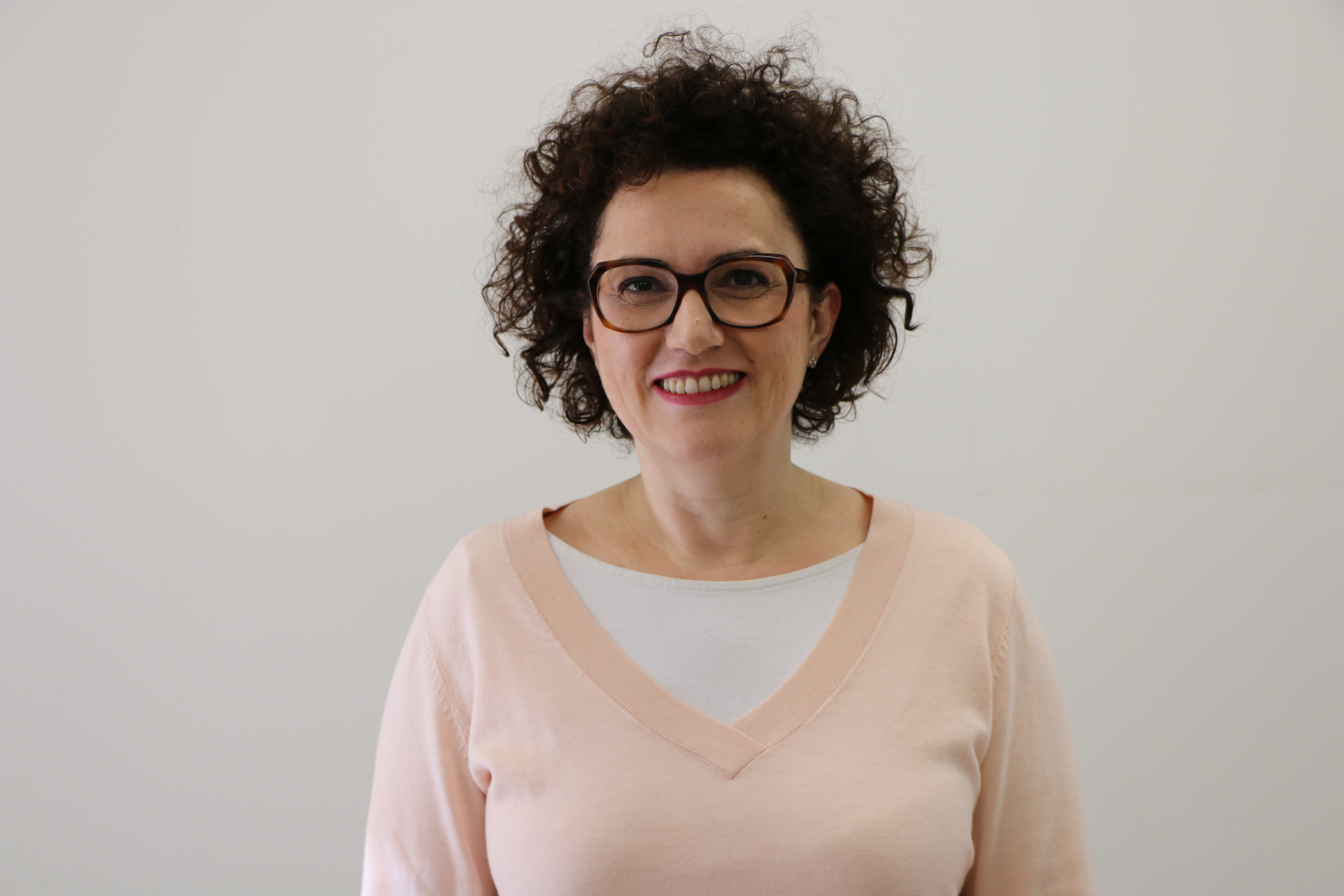

Minister of Civil Service and Reform of the Administration
- In office 22 May 2019 – July 2021
- Prime Minister: Xavier Espot Zamora
- Succeeded by: Trinitat Marín González

Personal details
- Born: 5 August 1972 (age 54) Barcelona, Spain
- Party: Action for Andorra
- Education: University of Barcelona

Judith Pallarés i Cortés (born 5 August 1972) is an Andorran politician who was the Minister of Civil Service and Reform of the Administration between 2019 and 2023.

== Early life ==
She was born in the Catalan city of Barcelona on 5 August 1972 and studied Political and Administration Science at the University of Barcelona.

== Political career ==
She joined the Liberal Party of Andorra in 2001. Between 2003 and 2007 was city councillor of La Massana and got a seat in the General Council in the 2015 Andorran parliamentary election, but she didn't revalidated it in the 2019 election.

She was also a member of the Andorran delegation to the Parliamentary Assembly of the Council of Europe from 2015 until January 2018. In parliament, she focused on actions at the European level, especially democracy, and human rights. In 2019, she was appointed Minister of Civil Service and Reform of the Administration, and was succeeded in July 2021 by Trinitat Marín González. Alongside this, from 2018 to 2021, she served as treasurer of Liberal International.

She left the Liberal Party of Andorra in 2022, which she had been a member of since 2001, alongside four other councillors, while reaffirming that she would continue in her ministerial portfolio until the end of the legislature. Pallarés announced she left the party due to "toxic management" from its leaders at the time, including Jordi Gallardo, and what she called an "ideological shift," saying the party had begun to defend more conservative positions. Following this, the four councillors and she formed the Action for Andorra party, which is social liberal and was set to compete in the 2023 Andorran parliamentary election. During the 2023 elections, she did not obtain a seat in the General Council, but the party did not manage to obtain one seat for Escaldes-Engordany with the representation being Marc Magallón.

In 2024, after leaving her ministerial role, she was announced as the Secretary General of the Andorran Women's Institute, replacing Montserrat Ronchera.
