= Ester Vilarrubla =

Andorran politician (born 1965)

Andorran Minister of Education and Higher Education
- Incumbent
- Assumed office 2019

Personal details
- Born: 1965 (age 60–61) La Seu d'Urgell, Catalonia, Spain
- Party: Democrats for Andorra
- Education: University Ramon Llull

Ester Vilarrubla Escales (born 1965), is an Andorran politician and educator, who is serving as Minister of Education and Higher Education in the government of Xavier Espot since 22 May 2019.

Born in La Seu d'Urgell, Catalonia, Spain, Vilarrubla studied Education at Ramon Llull University, in Barcelona. She was a Catalan language teacher between 1985 and 1991 in Barcelona, between 1991 and 2011 in Andorra. In the 2015 Andorran local elections she won a seat on the Andorra la Vella city council, representing the Democrats for Andorra.
