= Ester Molné =

Andorran lawyer, judge and politician (born 1977)

Minister of Justice and Interior
- Incumbent
- Assumed office 17 May 2023
- Prime Minister: Xavier Espot
- Preceded by: Josep Maria Rossell Pons

Member of the General Council of Andorra
- In office 2019–2023

Personal details
- Born: 21 January 1977 (age 49) La Massana, Andorra
- Party: Democrats for Andorra
- Education: University of Toulouse; University of Andorra

Ester Molné Soldevila (born 21 January 1977) is an Andorran judge, lawyer and politician, Minister of Justice and Interior of Andorra since 2023 in the government of Prime Minister Xavier Espot. She previously served as member of the General Council between 2019 and 2023.

== Career ==
Molné was born on 21 January 1977 in La Massana, Andorra. She graduated in law from the University of Toulouse and a postgraduate degree in Andorran law from the University of Andorra.

She worked at the Batllia d'Andorra (trial court) as judicial secretary between 2000 and 2003 and as judge between 2003 and 2009. Between 2016 and 2019, Molné served as Secretary of State for Justice and the Interior while Xavier Espot was Minister.

In the 2019 parliamentary election, Molné was elected member of the General Council for Democrats for Andorra (DA). She was president of the Legislative Committee on Justice, Home Affairs and Institutional Affairs and was a member of the Legislative Committee on Education, Research, Culture, Youth and Sports.

On 16 May 2023 she was appointed the new Minister of Justice and Interior in the second cabinet of Prime Minister Xavier Espot and was sworn in the following day. On 18 May 2023 Molné appointed Joan Antoni León as the new Secretary of State for Justice and the Interior.

In June 2023, she defended the measure to tighten family reunification for resident immigrants. In February 2025, was called upon to resign by the Andorran Prison Union following the suicide of a prisoner, the assault of two officials, and the resulting protests against her management. Months later, in July, Molné presented the Government Action Plan for the Improvement of the Internal Organisation of the Comella Prison, which includes new measures such as replacing night-time detention with a semi-open prison system, facilitating community service work and extending the time spent outside the cells. She has also proposed, in a new law, reducing the maximum period of pre-trial detention from sixteen to twelve months.

Amid the deadly wildfires in Spain in August 2025, Molné ordered the dispatch of a fire engine and a fire van with eight firefighters.
