= 2019 Andorran local elections =

The 2019 Andorran local elections were held on 15 December, to elect all councillors in the seven parishes of Andorra.

== Electoral system ==
Voters elected the members of the municipal councils (consells de comú in Catalan). The Electoral Law allows the municipal councils to choose the numbers of seats, which must be an even number between 10 and 16.

All city council members were elected in single multi-member districts, consisting of the whole parish, using closed lists. Half of the seats were allocated to the party with the most votes. The other half of the seats were allocated using the Hare quota (including the winning party). With this system the winning party obtained an absolute majority.

The cònsol major (mayor) and the cònsol menor (deputy mayor) will be elected indirectly by the municipal councillors after the election.

== Parties and leaders ==
A total of 21 lists were contesting the election. In Encamp, Ordino and Escaldes-Engordany there were 4 candidacies; in Andorra la Vella and Sant Julià de Lòria, 3; in Canillo, 2; and in la Massana only one list was contesting the election. For first time since the 2007 election, two lists were contesting the election in Canillo. In Sant Julià de Lòria, the incumbent mayor was unable to form a candidacy.

Parish	Candidacy name	Parties composing the list	Main candidate
Canillo	Common Objective	Independents	Albert Torres Babot
Canillo	Democrats + Independents	DA, independents	Francesc Camp Torres
Encamp	Third Way + Independents	TV, independents	Santiago Gonzalez Campos
Encamp	Social Democratic Party and Independents	PS, independents	David Ríos Rius
Encamp	Encamp Grouping	Independents	Esther Vidal Mils
Encamp	In Common for Encamp	DA, L'A, independents	Laura Mas Barrionuevo
Ordino	For Ordino	Independents	Enric Dolsa Font
Ordino	Third Way + Independents	TV, independents	Jordi Balsa Isern
Ordino	Let's move Ordino	PS, independents	Sandra Tudo Montanya
Ordino	In Common for Ordino	ACO, DA, L'A, SDP	Josep Angel Mortes Pons
La Massana	Committed Citizens + DA + L'A	CC, DA, L'A	Olga Molne Soldevila
Andorra la Vella	Third Way + Independents	TV, independents	Emi Matarrodona Corretja
Andorra la Vella	In Common for Andorra la Vella	DA, L'A, SDP	Conxita Marsol Riart
Andorra la Vella	Social Democratic Party and Independents	PS, independents	Maria Dolors Carmona Filella
Sant Julià de Lòria	Third Way + Lauredian Union + Independents	TV, UL, independents	Josep Majoral Obiols
Sant Julià de Lòria	Together for Change	PS, independents	Joan Travesset Grau
Sant Julià de Lòria	Wake up Laurèdia	Independents	Cerni Cairat Perrigault
Escaldes-Engordany	Democrats + Independents	DA, independents	Miquel Aleix Areny
Escaldes-Engordany	Union for Escaldes-Engordany	L'A, SDP, independents	Higini Martínez-Illescas Bermejo
Escaldes-Engordany	Social Democratic Party and Independents	PS, independents	Rosa Gili Casals
Escaldes-Engordany	Third Way + Independents	TV, independents	Jordi Rubia Correa

== Results ==
Winning list by parish

Final turnout was 56.54%, four percentage points lower than in the 2015 election. Abstention was over 50% in Andorra la Vella.

Candidacies supported by Democrats for Andorra won the election in five out of seven parishes, while in Sant Julià de Lòria, the candidacy formed by Third Way and Lauredian Union won. The Social Democrats won in Escaldes-Engordany.

=== Canillo ===
Party	Votes	%	Seats
Democrats + Independents	424	59.7	8
Common Objective	286	40.3	2
Blank votes	28	–	–
Invalid votes	6	–	–
Total	744	100	10
Registered/turnout	1,051	70.8	–

=== Encamp ===
Party	Votes	%	Seats
In Common for Encamp (DA+L'A)	894	41.3	9
Social Democratic Party and Independents	615	28.4	2
Encamp Grouping	503	23.2	1
Third Way + Independents	154	7.1	0
Blank votes	117	–	–
Invalid votes	32	–	–
Total	2,315	100	12
Registered/turnout	4,000	57.8	–

=== Ordino ===
Party	Votes	%	Seats
In Common for Ordino (DA+L'A+SDP+ACO)	552	45.0	8
For Ordino	302	24.6	1
Let's move Ordino	281	22.9	1
Third Way + Independents	93	7.6	0
Blank votes	72	–	–
Invalid votes	15	–	–
Total	1,315	100	10
Registered/turnout	1,790	73.5	–

=== La Massana ===
Party	Votes	%	Seats
Committed Citizens + DA + L'A	912	100.0	12
Blank votes	589	–	–
Invalid votes	97	–	–
Total	1,598	100	12
Registered/turnout	3,125	51.1	–

=== Andorra la Vella ===
Party	Votes	%	Seats
In Common for Andorra la Vella (DA+L'A+SDP)	1,943	51.2	9
Social Democratic Party and Independents	1,457	38.4	3
Third Way + Independents	394	10.4	0
Blank votes	184	–	–
Invalid votes	52	–	–
Total	4,030	100	12
Registered/turnout	8,242	48.9	–

=== Sant Julià de Lòria ===
Party	Votes	%	Seats
Third Way + Unió Laurediana + Independents	1,159	48.6	9
Wake up Laurèdia	970	40.7	3
Together for Change	257	10.8	0
Blank votes	128	–	–
Invalid votes	21	–	–
Total	2,534	100	12
Registered/turnout	4,126	61.4	–

=== Escaldes-Engordany ===
Party	Votes	%	Seats
Social Democratic Party and Independents	1,377	45.6	9
Democrats + Independents	1,367	45.3	3
Union for Escaldes-Engordany (L'A+SDP)	168	5.6	0
Third Way + Independents	106	3.5	0
Blank votes	141	–	–
Invalid votes	36	–	–
Total	3,195	100	12
Registered/turnout	5,489	58.2	–
