= Víctor Naudi =

Andorran politician

Víctor Naudi Zamora (born 28 August 1958) is an Andorran architect and politician. He was the president of the Social Democratic Party (PS), serving in the General Council (2007–2009) and then as minister of the interior in the government of Jaume Bartumeu until its defeat in 2011. He left PS at the start of 2013 and established Social Democracy and Progress (SDP) alongside Bartumeu, leading its candidacy and being one of its two members elected to the General Council in 2015. The party lost its representatives in the 2019 election.

== Biography ==
Naudi is an architect and has criticised Andorra's building development since the Spanish Civil War, believing it to be rapid and unplanned. In 2021, he designed a new 11-room building for The British College of Andorra.

Naudi was a councillor in Escaldes–Engordany from 1999 to 2007, then a member of the General Council until 2009, when he became minister of the interior in the Social Democratic Party (PS) government of the prime minister of Andorra, Jaume Bartumeu. He left office in May 2011, when Antoni Martí of the Democrats for Andorra (DA) became prime minister.

Naudi was a member of the Parliamentary Assembly of the Council of Europe from 9 October 2017 as a substitute, then permanently from 22 January 2018 to 23 June 2019. He was a vice-chair of the Socialists, Democrats and Greens Group.

Naudi was the PS president, resigning in January 2013 amidst a controversy within the party, where Bartumeu was accusing it of becoming too radical. The following month, Naudi was a founding member of Social Democracy and Progress (SDP), which began as a current within the PS for those supporting Bartumeu. After fully separating from the party, Naudi led SDP in the 2015 Andorran parliamentary election, receiving 11.7% of the vote on the national list and two seats in the General Council.

In the 2019 election, Josep Roig led the SDP candidacy, with Naudi 13th on the party's national list. The party lost about a third of its votes compared to four years earlier, and both representatives on the General Council.
