= Sílvia Calvó =

Andorran environmental engineer and politician (born 1969)

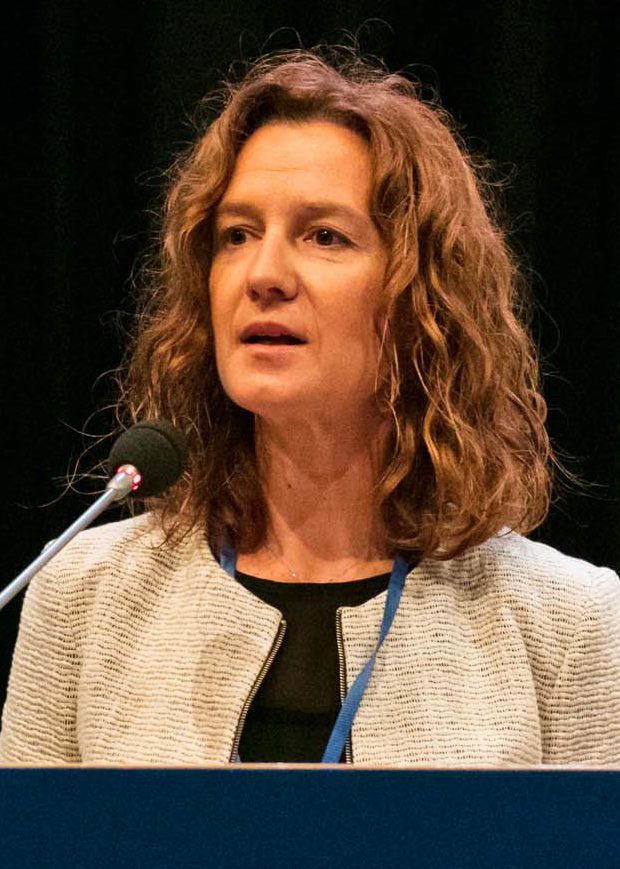
- Calvó in 2017

Minister of Environment, Agriculture and Sustainability
- In office 1 April 2015 – 15 May 2023
- Prime Minister: Antoni Martí; Xavier Espot Zamora
- Preceded by: Francesc Camp i Torres
- Succeeded by: Guillem Casal Font

Personal details
- Born: October 15, 1969 (age 56) Andorra la Vella, Andorra
- Party: Democrats for Andorra
- Education: University of Toulouse; University of Nice Sophia Antipolis
- Occupation: Environmental engineer and politician

Sílvia Calvó i Armengol (born 15 October 1969) is an Andorran environmental engineer, Minister of Environment, Agriculture and Sustainability of Andorra between 2015 and 2023.

Born and raised in Andorra la Vella, in 1993 she graduated in Environmental Technology Engineering from the School of Environmental Engineers of Chambéry and in 1997 he graduated in management from the University of Toulouse. In 2008 she did a master's degree in Business Administration from the University of Nice Sophia Antipolis.

Her entire professional career is being carried out in the Environment Department of the Government of Andorra. From 2002 to 2005 and from 2007 to 2009, he has assumed the direction of this department. She belongs to the electoral coalition Democrats for Andorra (DA) that was formed after the Parliamentary Elections of 2011, in which she was chosen as deputy in the General Council of Andorra.

As a parliamentarian, she has held the presidency of the Economic Legislative Commission and the vice-president of the Health and Environment Commission. She has also been an alternate member of the Andorran Delegation to the Assembly of the Organization for Security and Cooperation in Europe (OSCE) and a member of the Andorran Section in the Assembly of the International Organization of la Francophonie.

In 2015 Calvó was appointed by Prime Minister Antoni Martí, as new Minister of Environment, Agriculture and Sustainabilityof Andorra. She was reappointed by the new prime minister Xavier Espot on 20 May 2019. She was succeeded on 15 May 2023 by Guillem Casal Font.
