= Riart =

Riart is a surname. Notable people with the surname include:

- Conxita Marsol Riart (born 1960), Andorran lawyer and politician
- Luis Alberto Riart (1880–1953), Paraguayan politician
- Luis Alberto Riart (minister) (fl. early 21st century), Paraguayan politician
