= Helena Mas =

Andorran psychologist and politician (born 1977)

Minister of Health
- Incumbent
- Assumed office 17 May 2023
- Prime Minister: Xavier Espot
- Preceded by: Albert Font Massip

Personal details
- Born: 1979 (age 46–47) Sant Julià de Lòria, Andorra
- Party: Democrats for Andorra
- Education: University of Barcelona

Helena Mas Santuré (born 1979) is an Andorran psychologist and politician, Minister of Health of Andorra since 2023 in the government of Prime Minister Xavier Espot.

== Career ==
Mas was born in 1979 in Sant Julià de Lòria, Andorra. She got a degree in psychology from the University of Barcelona and specialised in clinical psychology for adults and adolescents, psychotherapy in cancer patients, legal psychology and forensic psychological assessment. She has also worked in education.

She was on the national list of the Democrats for Andorra (DA) party in the 2019 parliamentary election, but did not win a seat. Following the formation of Xavier Espot's new government, the newly appointed Minister of Health Joan Martínez Benazet proposed her as Secretary of State for Health, which was approved by the Government on 19 June 2019.

During the COVID-19 pandemic in Andorra, on several occasions, Mas announced the number of infections and deaths in the country at press conferences. In 2021, she also presented a psychological care programme aimed at those affected by the pandemic. That year, she promoted a population survey to detect persistent COVID-19 in adults, who had already had the disease. On 14 December 2021, Mas signed, on behalf of Andorra, the Council of Europe's Convention for the Protection of Human Rights and Dignity of the Human Being with regard to the Application of Biology and Medicine. Months later, in March 2022, she informed that the bill to create the legislative framework for developing research in health and biomedicine had been submitted to Parliament for consideration, with research on medicines and with animals and biological samples as the main new features.

In the 2023 parliamentary election, Mas led the DA's regional candidacy in her hometown, but she did not win a seat either. On 16 May 2023 she was appointed the new Minister of Health in the second cabinet of Prime Minister Xavier Espot and was sworn in the following day. In June 2023 Mas named Cristina Pérez as the new Secretary of State of Health, taking up the position vacated by Mas herself.

In September 2024, she presented the main strategic lines in mental health in the Comprehensive Mental Health Plan, among which early detection in the education system and the extension of the plan's actions to the elderly stand out. Mas, in December 2024, presented a package of measures to improve healthcare in Andorra, particularly in the areas of oncology and mental health, including the comprehensive reform of the oncology unit, the launch of a breast cancer unit so that patients do not have to go abroad, the development of the National Oncology Plan, as well as the launch of a suicide prevention helpline, a psycho-emotional support chat service, the electronic prescription project and the update of the National Plan against Drug Addiction.

Between March and April 2025, her powers were transferred to Prime Minister Espot due to her maternity leave.
