= Josep Pintat Forné =

Andorran politician

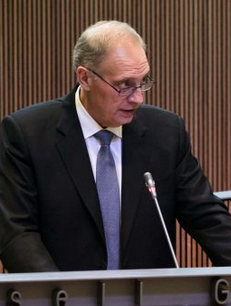

Josep Pintat Forné (born 31 August 1960) is an Andorran politician. A member of the General Council from 2015 to 2023, he was formerly a member of the Lauredian Union (UL) and led the Liberals of Andorra (AL) to second place in the 2015 election. He founded the Third Way (TV) in 2018, leading them to fourth place in the 2019 election.

== Biography ==
Born in Sant Julià de Lòria, Pintat is the son of Josep Pintat Solans and cousin of Albert Pintat, both of whom served as prime minister of Andorra. He graduated in Economic Sciences from the University of Barcelona, and has worked for companies in Andorra's petrol and tobacco industries. As of March 2019, he is married and had sons aged 30 and 26.

Pintat was his hometown's councillor in charge of finances from 1988 to 1991, and was its mayor from 2004 to 2007 and 2008 to 2011. Formerly a member of the Lauredian Union (UL), he was elected to the General Council in the 2015 election as leader of the Liberals of Andorra (LA). His party came second to the Democrats for Andorra of prime minister Antoni Martí, with eight out of 28 seats: four on the national list and both parish seats each for La Massana and Sant Julià de Lòria.

Pintat was one of several LA members who left the party and made a mixed group, in disagreement with the party forming a pact with the Social Democratic Party (PS). In October 2018, he formed the Third Way (TV). At the end of November, he announced that he would lead the party in the 2019 Andorran parliamentary election, on a joint list with the UL. The party took four of 28 seats, making it the smallest of the four parties in the General Council.

In February 2023, Pintat announced that TV would not contest the election in April, believing that the time was not right for their platform.
