= Citizens' Initiative (Andorra) =

- Abbreviation: IC
- Leader: Sergi Ricart
- Founded: 2012
- Headquarters: Encamp
- Ideology: Social liberalism Reformism; Populism

Website
- Official website

Citizens' Initiative (Catalan: Iniciativa Ciutadana, IC) is a social-liberal and reformist political party in Andorra led by Sergi Ricart.

== History ==
Established in 2012, the IC ran in the 2015 parliamentary elections as part of a coalition with the Social Democratic Party, the Greens and independents. In the constituency elections the alliance received 24% of the vote but failed to win a seat. However, it also received 24% of the proportional representation vote, winning three seats. The coalition was dissolved in April 2017 and the party did not contest the 2019 parliamentary elections.
