= Roser Bastida Areny =

Andorran politician

Member of the General Council
- In office 2009–2015
- Constituency: Sant Julià de Lòria

Personal details
- Born: 28 September 1955 (age 70)
- Party: Lauredian Union; Democrats for Andorra

Roser Bastida Areny (born 28 September 1955) is an Andorran politician who served in the General Council from 2009 to 2015, as a member of the Lauredian Union and Democrats for Andorra.

Born in 1955, Arney was educated in Barcelona, Spain, and worked in Andorra's Ministry of Education and Department of Education. Prior to her tenure in the General Council, she was a member of the council of Sant Julià de Lòria.

== Early life and education ==
Roser Bastida Areny was born on 28 September 1955, and grew up in Sant Julià de Lòria, Andorra. She attended a French-language lyceum in Barcelona, Spain, and would return to Andorra for holidays. She graduated from college with a bachelor of arts and master's degree.

== Career ==
From 1981 to 1990, Areny was an advisor to Andorra's Ministry of Education and director of the Department of Education from 1990 to 2002. She was a member of Sant Julià de Lòria's council from 1984 to 1988. From 2005 to 2007, she was the Minister of Education and Vocational Training and Minister of Education, Vocational Training, Youth and Sports from 2007 to 2009.

Arney was elected in 2009 and 2011 to represent the Sant Julià de Lòria constituency in the General Council. During her tenure she has served on the Territorial Policy and Urban Planning committee and was president of the Education, Culture, Youth and Sports committee from 2009 to 2011. She was a member of the Lauredian Union, but later joined the Democrats for Andorra, which was a successor to the Reformist Coalition that Arney was a member of.

In 2017, Arney was offered the position of ambassador to the European Union, but declined. In 2024, the Andorran Olympic Committee gave her an award for helping to develop skiing in the country.

== Works cited ==
=== Books ===
- Anton, Jordi (2024). Del Consell de la Terra al Consell Genera. General Council. ISBN 9789992052525.

=== News ===
- "El Govern ofereix a Esther Rabassa ser ambaixadora davant la UE en substitució d'Ubach". Radio and Television of Andorra. 7 July 2017. Archived from the original on 7 April 2025.
- "La divisió liberal i l'actitud de Vila amb la llei comunal apropen UL i DA". El Periòdic d'Andorra. 11 November 2017. Archived from the original on 7 April 2025.
- "Reconeixement a polítics per la seva contribució a l'esquí". Radio and Television of Andorra. 1 October 2024. Archived from the original on 7 April 2025.
- "Reconeixements de la neu FAE-COA 2024 a Albert Pintat, Toni Martí, Carles Font i Roser Bastida". Forum. 30 September 2024. Archived from the original on 7 April 2025.
- Asara, Eva. "Roser Bastida Areny". El Periòdic d'Andorra. Archived from the original on 7 April 2025.

=== Web ===
- "Roser Bastida Areny". General Council. Archived from the original on 7 April 2025.
- "Roser Bastida Areny". General Council. Archived from the original on 7 April 2025.
