= Josep Pintat =

Josep Pintat may refer to:

- Josep Pintat Solans (1925–2007), prime minister of Andorra
- Josep Pintat Forné (born 1960), Andorran politician, son of the above
