= Jordi Font Mariné =

Andorran politician (born 1955)

Jordi Font Mariné (born 18 October 1955) is an Andorran politician. He is a member of the Social Democratic Party of Andorra.
