= Mariona González Reolit =

Andorran politician

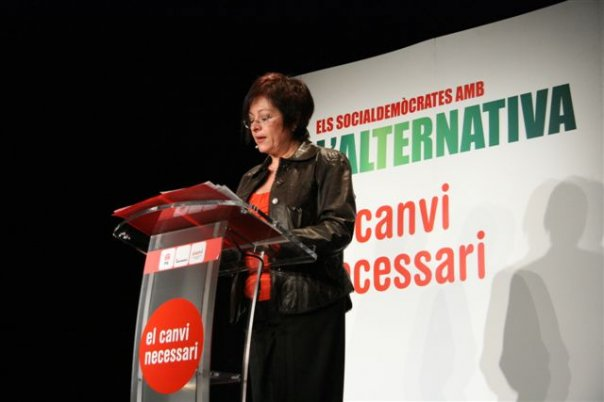

Mariona González Reolit (born 4 November 1957), is an Andorran politician, member of the Parliament of Andorra between 2005 and 2015. She was secretary of the presidency of the parliament between 2009 and 2011, president of the Commission of the Legislative Commission of Social Affairs. Between 2005 and 2009 she was president of the Socialist Party, and between 2013 and 2015 of the Socialists parliamentary group.
