= Executive Council of Andorra =

The Executive Council of Andorra (Catalan: Consell Executiu d'Andorra) is the chief executive body of the Principality of Andorra.

Under the 1993 constitution, the co-princes continue as heads of state, but the head of government retains executive power. The two co-princes serve coequally with limited powers that do not include veto over government acts. Both are represented in Andorra by a delegate, although since 1993, both France and Spain have their own embassies. As co-princes of Andorra, the president of France and the bishop of Urgell maintain supreme authority in approval of all international treaties with France and Spain, as well as all those that deal with internal security, defense, Andorran territory, diplomatic representation, and judicial or penal cooperation. Although the institution of the co-princes is viewed by some as an anachronism, the majority sees them as both a link with Andorra's traditions and a way to balance the power of Andorra's two much larger neighbors.

The way the two co-princes are chosen makes Andorra one of the most politically distinct nations on Earth. One co-prince is the current sitting president of France, currently Emmanuel Macron (it has historically been any head of state of France, including kings and emperors of the French). The other is the current Roman Catholic bishop of the Catalan city of La Seu d'Urgell, currently Josep-Lluís Serrano Pentinat. As neither prince lives in Andorra, their role is almost entirely ceremonial.

After the 2023 Andorran parliamentary election, the new government of the prime minister was appointed on 17 May 2023.

== Current members of the Executive Council ==
Portfolio	Minister	Party	Term of office	^{Ref.}
Head of Government	Xavier Espot Zamora	DA	16 May 2019 – present	
Minister of Presidency, Economy, Labour and Housing	Conxita Marsol Riart	DA	17 May 2023 – present	
Minister of Institutional Relations, Education and Universities	Ladislau Baró Solà	DA	17 May 2023 – present	
Minister of Tourism and Commerce	Jordi Torres Falcó	DA	17 May 2023 – present	
Minister of Finance	Ramon Lladós Bernaus	DA	17 May 2023 – present	
Minister of External Affairs	Imma Tor Faus	DA	17 May 2023 – present	
Minister of Justice and Interior	Ester Molné Soldevila	DA	17 May 2023 – present	
Minister of Territorial Ordering and Urbanism	Raul Ferré Bonet	DA	17 May 2023 – present	
Minister of Social Affairs and Civil Service	Trinitat Marín González	DA	17 May 2023 – present	
Minister of Health	Helena Mas Santuré	DA	17 May 2023 – present	
Minister of Environment, Agriculture and Livestock	Guillem Casal Font	DA	17 May 2023 – present	
Minister of Culture, Youth and Sports	Mònica Bonell Tuset	DA	17 May 2023 – present	
Spokesman of the Government	Guillem Casal Font	DA	17 May 2023 – present	
