= Júlia Bonet Fité =

- Born: 28 July 1922
- Died: 3 September 2011 (aged 89); Vilafortuny, Spain
- Occupation: Businesswoman
- Relatives: Xavier Espot Zamora (grandson)

Júlia Bonet Fité (28 July 1922 – 3 September 2011) was an Andorran businesswoman, president and founder of Perfumeria Júlia.

== Early life ==
Bonet was the daughter of Francesc Bonet, a native of Peramola (Alt Urgell), refugee in Andorra because of the Rif War, and one of the daughters of Cal Farreró d'Escaldes. Up to 12 years of age, she attended the French school in Escaldes, together with her sisters. When leaving the school, all three would leave to France to work, while Bonet would stay in Andorra because of her parents' wishes. She started working as a hairdresser in a barber shop on the lower floors of the house, which had a small space dedicated to ladies' hairdressing. Since Andorra did not have the necessary materials, Bonet moved to Toulouse to buy materials to use in her establishment, and also to sell them.

The social changes that occurred in Andorra during the second half of the 20th century and the consumerist fever that became the root cause of the political situation in neighboring countries make Júlia Bonet increase the sale of products in a very significant way, leading her to move away from hairdressing toward the selling of perfumes.

In 1948, Bonet married Père Zamora, a worker of FHASA, who later joined the family business. With him, she had three daughters, Anna Maria, Melania and Immaculada, who would also end up joining the business.

== The business expansion ==
The success of the operation allowed the business to improve expand, and they gradually opened other stores in other parts of the country. Specifically, in 1958, Bonet would open what would be the second store on Meritxell Avenue of Andorra la Vella. In 1961, she opened a third store in Escaldes, under the name Anmei, based on the name of her three daughters. In 1970, she opened the Ibis d'Escaldes perfumery, motivated by the need not leave a part of the neglected clientele due to the works that were carried out in the mansion of Júlia Bonet.

The first center opened outside the central and commercial center of the country in Pas de la Casa, in 1983, which encouraged sales to visitors from Andorra on the French border.

Towards 1985, Bonet decided to close the hairdresser's shop, and to build one of the centers for marriage, the Júlia Center, presided over by a monumental clock called "Horloge à voir le temps couler", by Bernard Gitton. At that time, she also decided to create her own range of products, which would later be updated in 2004.

In 1999, the business began to expand outside the Andorran borders, specifically into Spain, where she opened several perfumeries around the country.

== Death ==
On the morning of 3 September 2011, Bonet suffered a cardiorespiratory arrest in her apartment located in Vilafortuny (Cambrils). She was transferred to the Hospital de Reus, and nothing could be done to save her life. The burial took place in the Church of Sant Pere Màrtir in Escaldes-Engordany on September 5. In mourning, all Perfumeria Júlia stores were kept closed for two days.
