= Third Way (Andorra) =

Third Way Tercera Via
- Abbreviation: TV
- Leader: Josep Pintat Forné
- Founded: 2018
- Split from: Liberals of Andorra
- Succeeded by: Andorra Forward (de facto)
- Ideology: Conservatism; Souverainism
- Political position: Centre-right to right-wing
- General Council: 2 / 28

Website
- www.terceravia.ad

Third Way (Catalan: Tercera Via) is a conservative political party in Andorra formed by the Lauredian Union and former members of the Liberal Party. The party is led by Josep Pintat Forné.

== History ==
The party was founded at the end of 2018 to contest the 2019 general election. The party is formed mainly by the Sant Julià de Lòria-based Lauredian Union and members of the Liberal Party who left the party in 2017. It received support from the Virtus Unita Fortior group, as well.

The former premier Albert Pintat ran as a candidate in the 2019 election and supported the party.

In the 2019 election, the party received the 10.4% of the volts and obtained 4 seats in the General Council, becoming the fourth strongest political party in Andorra.

Third Way is contesting the 2019 local elections in 5 out of 7 parishes.

== Election results ==
Election	Votes	%	Seats	+/–	Position	Government
2019	1,853	10.4	4 / 28	▲4	▲4th	Opposition
