= Ministry of Justice (Andorra) =

Government ministry of Andorra

The Ministry of Social Affairs, Justice and Interior of Andorra (Catalan: Ministeri d'Afers Socials, Justícia i Interior d'Andorra) is responsible for social care and protection, employment and work. The ministry aims to guarantee the internal security of citizens and their assets, civil status, the regulation of migration and integration policy to guarantee social cohesion, the fight against crime, international collaboration in matters judicial and police, and protecting the population from any natural risk or catastrophe.

== List of ministers ==
=== Minister of Justice and Home Affairs ===
- Jordi Guitart Visent (2001–2005)

=== Minister of Justice and Interior ===
- Josep Maria Cabanes (2005–2007)
- Antoni Riberaygua (2007–2009)

=== Minister of Interior ===
- Víctor Naudi Zamora (2009–2011)

=== Minister of Justice and Interior ===
- Marc Vila i Amigó (2011–2013)
- Xavier Espot Zamora (2014–2017)

=== Minister of Social Affairs, Justice and Interior ===
- Xavier Espot Zamora (2017–present)

== See also ==
- Justice ministry
- Ministeri d'Afers Socials, Justícia i Interior d'Andorra [Ministry of Social Affairs, Justice and Interior of Andorra]
- Politics of Andorra
