= Mònica Bonell Tuset =

Andorran politician

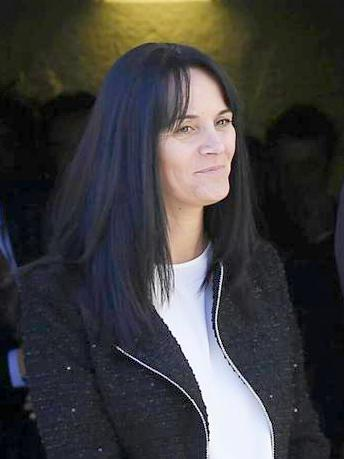

Minister of Culture and Sports
- Incumbent
- Assumed office 17 May 2023
- Prime Minister: Xavier Espot Zamora
- Preceded by: Sílvia Riva González

Deputy General Syndic of the General Council
- In office 28 April 2011 – 2 May 2019
- General Syndic: Vicenç Mateu Zamora
- Preceded by: Esteve López Montanya
- Succeeded by: Meritxell Palmitjavila Naudí

Personal details
- Born: 7 August 1971 (age 54)
- Party: Democrats for Andorra

Mònica Bonell Tuset (born 7 August 1971) is a Democratic politician from Andorra. She worked in the tourism industry. She was second deputy mayor of the city of Canillo for eight years, and Deputy General Syndic of the General Council of Andorra for a further eight years. From 2023, she is the Andorran Minister of Culture, Youth and Sports.

== Life ==
Bonell Tuset was born in 1971, and graduated with a degree in tourism. She then worked in a number of companies involved in tourist activities, with her focus being on administrative work. She also worked in public administration. Her move into a political career began when she served as second deputy mayor of the city of Canillo from 2003 and 2011. She was immediately afterwards Deputy General Syndic of the General Council of Andorra between 2011 and 2019. She was a member of the political party Alliance of Liberals and Democrats for Europe.

She has served as the Chairman of the Democratic Parliamentary Group, President of the Legislative Economy Committee, Member of the Legislative Committee on Foreign Policy, Member of the Legislative Committee on Territorial Policy, Urban Planning, and as the Environment Member of the Andorran Delegation to the Parliamentary Assembly of the Council of Europe (APCE).

On 16 May 2023 Bonell Tuset was appointed Minister of Culture, Youth and Sports and was sworn in the following day. In that position, she met with Council of Europe experts in June 2024 to discuss the drafting of a Youth Action Plan. She announced in June 2024 plans to renovate the national stadium by replacing the grass playing surface with artificial turf.
