= Patrick Strzoda =

French civil servant (born 1952)

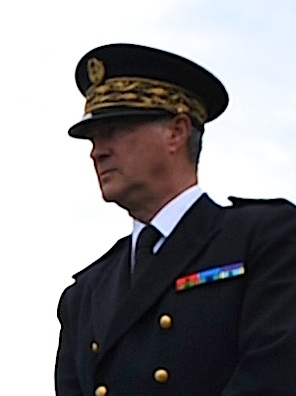
- Strzoda in 2014

Representative of the French Co-Prince of Andorra
- In office 14 May 2017 – 20 November 2024
- Monarch: Emmanuel Macron
- Prime Minister: Antoni Martí; Xavier Espot Zamora
- Preceded by: Jean-Pierre Hugues
- Succeeded by: Patrice Faure

Personal details
- Born: 5 January 1952 (age 74) Thann, Haut-Rhin, France
- Education: University of Franche-Comté; University of Strasbourg; École nationale d'administration
- Awards: Legion of Honour; National Order of Merit; Order of Academic Palms; Order of Agricultural Merit

Patrick Strzoda (French: [patʁik stʁɔda], Polish: [ˈstʂɔda]; born 5 January 1952) is a French high-ranking civil servant, a former prefect, and advisor to French President Emmanuel Macron. As President of France, Macron also serves ex officio as one of the two co-princes of Andorra. Strzoda served as his representative in this capacity from 2017 to 2024.

== Early life ==
Patrick Strzoda was born on 5 January 1952, in Thann, Haut-Rhin, France. He graduated from the University of Franche-Comté, where he earned a degree in English, and from the University of Strasbourg, where he earned a law degree. He graduated from the École nationale d'administration in 1983.

== Career ==
Strzoda was the chief of staff to the Prefect of Dordogne from 1985 to 1987. He was the sub-prefect of Saint-Jean-de-Maurienne from 1987 to 1989, and the secretary general of the committee for the 1992 Winter Olympics in Albertville from 1989 to 1992. He was the secretary general of the prefecture of Drôme in Valence from 1992 to 1994, and the sub-prefect of Arles from 1995 to 1996. He was the director of information and community for the city of Paris from 1996 to 1997, and the secretary general for regional affairs for the prefecture of Rhône-Alpes from 1997 to 2002.

Strzoda was the Prefect of Hautes-Alpes from 2002 to 2004, the Prefect of Deux-Sèvres in 2005, and a prefect at the regional council of Savoie from 2006 to 2007. He was the Prefect of Hauts-de-Seine from 2009 to 2011, the Prefect of Corse-du-Sud from 2011 to 2013, and the Prefect of Brittany from June 2013 to May 2016.

Strzoda was Prime Minister Bernard Cazeneuve's chief of staff from 4 May 2016 to 27 April 2017. He was briefly the Prefect of Île-de-France in April–May 2017. On 14 May 2017, he was appointed by President Emmanuel Macron as his chief of staff. He served in that role until 1 January 2024, and four days later he was named as advisor to Macron. After this transition, he continued to serve as Macron's representative to Andorra. He was replaced in that role by Patrice Faure on 20 November 2024.

Strzoda is an officer of the Legion of Honour and the Order of Agricultural Merit, a knight of the Ordre des Palmes académiques, and a commander of the National Order of Merit.
