= Emili Prats Grau =

Andorran politician (born 1946)

Emili Prats Grau (born 1 June 1946) is an Andorran politician. He is a member of the Liberals of Andorra.
