= 2001 Andorran parliamentary election =

- 4 March 2001

All 28 seats in the General Council 15 seats needed for a majority

Parliamentary elections were held in Andorra on 4 March 2001. The result was a victory for the Liberal Party of Andorra, which won 15 of the 28 seats. Its leader, Marc Forné Molné, remained Prime Minister. Voter turnout was 81.6%.

== Results ==
| Party | PR | | | Constituency | | | Total seats | +/– |
| Party | Votes | % | Seats | Votes | % | Seats | Total seats | +/– |
|---|---|---|---|---|---|---|---|---|
| Liberal Party of Andorra | 4,739 | 46.18 | 7 | 3,884 | 38.03 | 8 | 15 | +5 |
| Social Democratic Party | 3,083 | 30.04 | 4 | 2,392 | 23.42 | 2 | 6 | New |
| Democratic Party | 2,441 | 23.78 | 3 | 2,247 | 22.00 | 2 | 5 | New |
| Lauredian Union | | | | 813 | 7.96 | 2 | 2 | 0 |
| Independent Group for Sant Julià | | | | 644 | 6.31 | 0 | 0 | New |
| Union for Progress | | | | 233 | 2.28 | 0 | 0 | New |
| Total | 10,263 | 100.00 | 14 | 10,213 | 100.00 | 14 | 28 | 0 |
| Valid votes | 10,263 | 94.25 | | 10,213 | 93.83 | | | |
| Invalid/blank votes | 626 | 5.75 | | 672 | 6.17 | | | |
| Total votes | 10,889 | 100.00 | | 10,885 | 100.00 | | | |
| Registered voters/turnout | 13,342 | 81.61 | | 13,342 | 81.58 | | | |
Source: Nohlen & Stöver, IPU

=== By constituency ===
Canillo
| Party | Votes | % | Seats |
|---|---|---|---|
| Liberal Party of Andorra | 249 | 51.66 | 2 |
| Union for Progress | 233 | 48.34 | 0 |
| Total | 482 | 100.00 | 2 |
| Valid votes | 482 | 97.18 | |
| Invalid/blank votes | 14 | 2.82 | |
| Total votes | 496 | 100.00 | |
| Registered voters/turnout | 562 | 88.26 | |

Encamp
| Party | Votes | % | Seats |
|---|---|---|---|
| Social Democratic Party | 590 | 40.63 | 2 |
| Liberal Party of Andorra | 531 | 36.57 | 0 |
| Democratic Party | 331 | 22.80 | 0 |
| Total | 1,452 | 100.00 | 2 |
| Valid votes | 1,452 | 95.59 | |
| Invalid/blank votes | 67 | 4.41 | |
| Total votes | 1,519 | 100.00 | |
| Registered voters/turnout | 1,845 | 82.33 | |

Ordino
| Party | Votes | % | Seats |
|---|---|---|---|
| Liberal Party of Andorra | 336 | 56.47 | 2 |
| Democratic Party | 259 | 43.53 | 0 |
| Total | 595 | 100.00 | 2 |
| Valid votes | 595 | 91.82 | |
| Invalid/blank votes | 53 | 8.18 | |
| Total votes | 648 | 100.00 | |
| Registered voters/turnout | 740 | 87.57 | |

La Massana
| Party | Votes | % | Seats |
|---|---|---|---|
| Democratic Party | 452 | 43.97 | 2 |
| Liberal Party of Andorra | 403 | 39.20 | 0 |
| Social Democratic Party | 173 | 16.83 | 0 |
| Total | 1,028 | 100.00 | 2 |
| Valid votes | 1,028 | 96.07 | |
| Invalid/blank votes | 42 | 3.93 | |
| Total votes | 1,070 | 100.00 | |
| Registered voters/turnout | 1,235 | 86.64 | |

Andorra la Vella
| Party | Votes | % | Seats |
|---|---|---|---|
| Liberal Party of Andorra | 1,185 | 40.07 | 2 |
| Social Democratic Party | 1,000 | 33.82 | 0 |
| Democratic Party | 772 | 26.11 | 0 |
| Total | 2,957 | 100.00 | 2 |
| Valid votes | 2,957 | 94.65 | |
| Invalid/blank votes | 167 | 5.35 | |
| Total votes | 3,124 | 100.00 | |
| Registered voters/turnout | 4,014 | 77.83 | |

Sant Julià de Lòria
| Party | Votes | % | Seats |
|---|---|---|---|
| Lauredian Union | 813 | 55.80 | 2 |
| Independent Group for Sant Julià | 644 | 44.20 | 0 |
| Total | 1,457 | 100.00 | 2 |
| Valid votes | 1,457 | 89.83 | |
| Invalid/blank votes | 165 | 10.17 | |
| Total votes | 1,622 | 100.00 | |
| Registered voters/turnout | 1,963 | 82.63 | |

Escaldes-Engordany
| Party | Votes | % | Seats |
|---|---|---|---|
| Liberal Party of Andorra | 1,180 | 52.63 | 2 |
| Social Democratic Party | 629 | 28.06 | 0 |
| Democratic Party | 433 | 19.31 | 0 |
| Total | 2,242 | 100.00 | 2 |
| Valid votes | 2,242 | 93.18 | |
| Invalid/blank votes | 164 | 6.82 | |
| Total votes | 2,406 | 100.00 | |
| Registered voters/turnout | 2,983 | 80.66 | |
