= 2007 Andorran local elections =

The 2007 Andorran local elections were held on 2 December. Voters elected the council members of the seven parishes.

Winning party by parish: Liberal Party of Andorra Social Democratic Party

== Electoral system ==
Voters elect the members of the municipal councils (consells de comú in Catalan). The electoral law allows the municipal councils to choose their numbers of seats, which must be an even number between 10 and 16.

All city council members were elected in single multi-member districts, consisting of the whole parish, using closed lists. Half of the seats were allocated to the party with the most votes. The other half of the seats were allocated using the Hare quota (including the winning party). With this system the winning party obtained an absolute majority.

The cònsol major (mayor) and the cònsol menor (deputy mayor) were elected indirectly by the municipal councilors.

== Results ==
=== Overall ===
Party	Votes	%	Seats	+/–
Liberal Party of Andorra	6,078	46.6%	46	–5
The Alternative	5,003	38.3%	29	+8
Greens of Andorra	829	6.4%	0	0
United for the Progress	782	6.0%	3	New
Ordino Communal Action	358	2.7%	8	New
Total	13,050	100	86	+4

The Social Democratic Party contested this election under the nickname "The Alternative". They hold their 2 parishes. The liberals hold 4 councils and lost Ordino council to Ordino Communal Action.

=== Canillo ===
Party	Votes	%	Seats	+/–
Liberal Party of Andorra	407	76.5	12	0
The Alternative	125	23.5	2	New
Total	532	100	14	0

=== Encamp ===
Party	Votes	%	Seats	+/–
The Alternative	822	45.9	9	0
United for the Progress	782	43.7	3	New
Greens of Andorra	185	10.3	0	New
Total	1,789	100	12	0

=== Ordino ===
Party	Votes	%	Seats	+/–
Ordino Communal Action	358	38.6	8	New
The Alternative	286	30.8	2	New
Liberal Party of Andorra	284	30.6	2	–6
Total	928	100	12	+2

=== La Massana ===
Party	Votes	%	Seats	+/–
Liberal Party of Andorra	852	58.1	9	+1
The Alternative	614	41.9	3	+3
Total	1,466	100	12	+2

=== Andorra la Vella ===
Party	Votes	%	Seats	+/–
The Alternative	1,912	53.8	9	0
Liberal Party of Andorra	1,398	39.4	3	0
Greens of Andorra	241	6.8	0	New
Total	3,551	100	12	0

=== Sant Julià de Lòria ===
Party	Votes	%	Seats	+/–
Liberal Party of Andorra - Lauredian Union	1,128	58.6	10	+1
The Alternative	517	26.9	2	+2
Greens of Andorra	279	14.5	0	New
Total	1,924	100	12	0

=== Escaldes-Engordany ===
Party	Votes	%	Seats	+/–
Liberal Party of Andorra	2,009	70.2	10	+1
The Alternative	727	25.4	2	–1
Greens of Andorra	124	4.3	0	New
Total	2,860	100	12	0
