= Luis Alberto Riart (minister) =

Paraguayan politician

Luis Alberto Riart was the Paraguayan Minister of Education and Culture under President Fernando Lugo.
