= Liberals of Andorra =

Liberals of Andorra Liberals d'Andorra
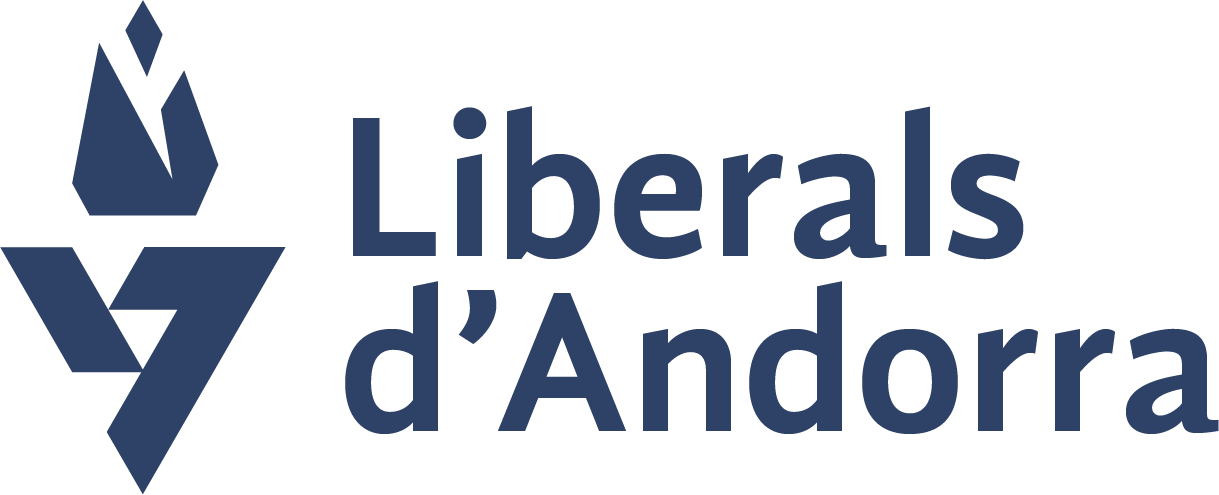
- Abbreviation: L'A (since 2012); UL (1992-2001); PLA (2001-2012)
- President: Cristina Rico
- Founder: Marc Forné Molné
- Founded: 1992
- Headquarters: Carrer de la Unió, Edifici Eland, 5è 3a AD500 Andorra la Vella
- Ideology: Conservative liberalism; Pro-Europeanism
- Political position: Centre-right
- European affiliation: Alliance of Liberals and Democrats for Europe
- International affiliation: Liberal International
- Colours: Navy blue and gold (since 2023); Light blue (until 2023)
- General Council: 0 / 28

Website
- www.liberals.ad

The Liberals of Andorra (Catalan: Liberals d'Andorra, LA) is a conservative-liberal political party in Andorra. It is a member of the Liberal International and the Alliance of Liberals and Democrats for Europe.

== History ==
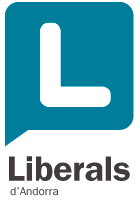
Previous logo of the Liberal Party

Previous logo of the Liberal Party (until November 2021)

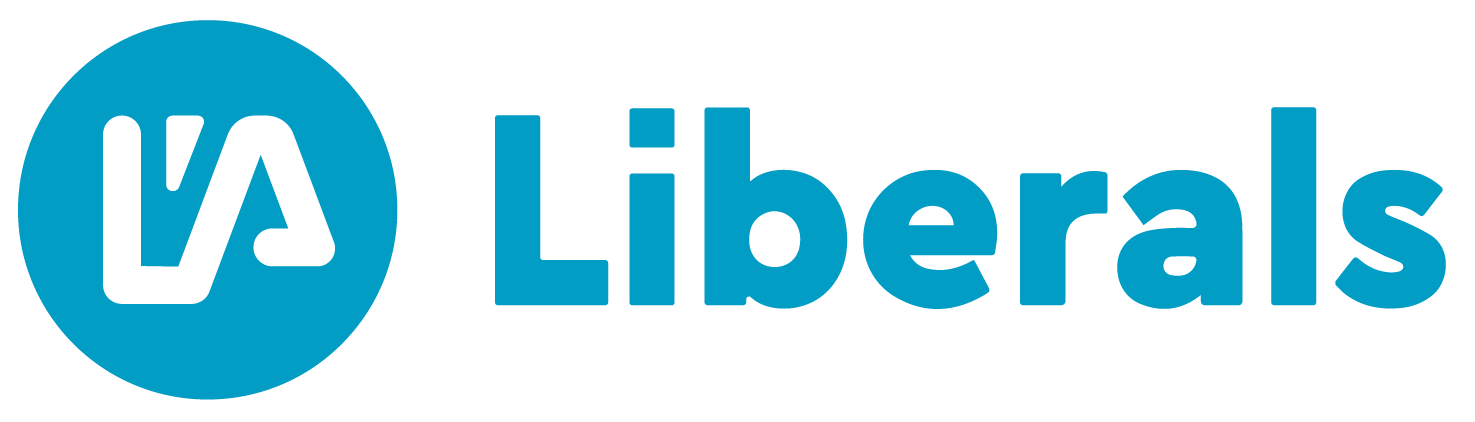
Previous logo of the Liberal Party (until June 2023)

The party was established as the Liberal Union (Unió Liberal) in 1992 by Marc Forné Molné. In the 1993 elections it received 22% of the vote and won five seats, making it the second largest party in the General Council. Although the party was in opposition after Òscar Ribas Reig formed a progressive coalition government, Ribas was forced out of office after losing a vote of no confidence and Forné became Prime Minister on 7 December 1994.

After two votes of no confidence, Forné called early elections in 1997. In the run-up to the elections the Union formed alliances with several local parties, including the Liberal Union–Liberal Group of Encamp, the Liberal Opinion Group (GOL), Unity and Renewal (UiR) and the Lauredian Union (UL), with the local parties contesting only at the parish level. The Union won 16 seats of which GOL took four, UL two and the UiR two, with Forné remaining Prime Minister.

Shortly before the 2001 elections the party was renamed the Liberal Party of Andorra (Partit Liberal d'Andorra) It won 46.1% of the popular vote and 15 seats, with Forné again remaining Prime Minister. In the 2005 elections the party lost another seat, but was still able to form a government, this time led by Albert Pintat. Pintat resigned the leadership, which passed to Joan Gabriel, before the 2009 elections.

In the elections the party was part of the Reformist Coalition alongside the Lauredian Union, Century 21, and two other political parties. The Coalition won 11 seats, whilst the Social Democrats won 14 seats and gained control of the government.

In the run up to the 2011 parliamentary election, the Liberal Party and the other members of the Reformist Coalition gave support to the Democrats for Andorra (DA). The new party chose Antoni Martí as leader and won the election on 3 April 2011 a landslide with 20 of the General Council's 28 seats.

Half way through the first term in office of Democrats for Andorra, a group of party activists started to actively work in order to run again separately in the 2015 elections. They presented their new name, Liberals of Andorra, and they announced their intention to stand candidates in the next parliamentary election.

In the 2015 parliamentary election held on 1 March 2015, the Liberal Party received 27.7% of the vote and 8 seats in the General Council.

== Election results ==
=== General Council elections ===
Election	Leader	Votes	%	Seats	+/–	Position	Status
1993	Marc Forné Molné	1,591	22.0	5 / 28	–	2nd	Opposition
1997	Marc Forné Molné	3,543	40.5	16 / 28	▲11	▲1st	Majority
2001	Marc Forné Molné	4.739	44.1	15 / 28	▼1	1st	Majority
2005	Marc Forné Molné	5,100	41.2	14 / 28	▼1	1st	Majority
2009 (Note: As part of the Reformist Coalition.)	Joan Gabriel i Estany	4,747	32.3	11 / 28	▼3	▼2nd	Opposition
2011	Did not run						Extra-parliamentary
2015	Josep Pintat Forné	4,073	27.7	8 / 28	▲8	2nd	Opposition
2019	Jordi Gallardo Fernández	2,219	12.5	4 / 28	▼4	▼3rd	Coalition
2023	Josep Maria Cabanes	893	4.7	0 / 28	▼4	▼5th	Extra-parliamentary

=== Local elections ===
Election	Votes	%	Seats	+/–	Position
1995	1,531	21.8	10 / 80	–	2nd
1999	3,187	38.1	24 / 80	▲14	▲1st
2003	5.224	47.7	51 / 82	▲27	1st
2007	6,078	46.6	46 / 86	▼5	1st
2011	Did not contest				
2015	3,498	26.1	10 / 80	▲10	2nd
2019	4,469	31.4	7 / 80	▼3	4th

== Notable members ==
- Marc Forné Molné
- Juli Minoves
- Jordi Gallardo
- Ferran Costa Marimon
- Judith Pallarés i Cortés
- Emili Prats Grau

== See also ==
- Liberalism
- Contributions to liberal theory
- Liberalism worldwide
- List of liberal parties
- Liberal democracy
