= 2011 Andorran local elections =

Winner by parish

The 2011 Andorran local elections were held on 4 December. Voters elected the representatives of the seven parishes.

== Electoral system ==
Voters elected the members of the municipal councils (consells de comú in Catalan). The electoral law allow the municipal councils to choose their number of seats, which must be an even number between 10 and 16.

All city council members were elected in single multi-member districts, consisting of the parish territory, using closed lists. Half of the seats are allocated to the party with more votes. The other half of the seats were allocated using the Hare quota (including the winning party).

The cònsol major (mayor) and the cònsol menor (deputy mayor) were elected indirectly by the municipal councilors after the election.

== Results ==
=== Overall ===
Party	Vote			Seats	
Party	Votes	%	±pp	Won	+/−
Democrats for Andorra (DA)	6,394	50.62	N/A	62	▲25
Social Democratic Party + Independents (PS+I)	3,182	25.19	N/A	8	▼18
Coalition of Independents (CD'I)	1,377	10.90	N/A	3	▲8
Committed Citizens (CC)	779	6.17	N/A	9	▲9
Massana Movement (MM)	591	4.68	N/A	3	▲3
Convergents for Ordino (CD'O)	308	2.44	N/A	2	▲2
Total	12,631	100.00		86	±0
Valid votes	12,631	87.13	N/A		
Blank votes	1,615	11.14	N/A		
Invalid votes	251	1.73	N/A		
Votes cast / turnout	14,497	64.77	▼7.48		
Registered voters	22,381				
Source: Government of Andorra

=== Canillo ===
Party	Vote			Seats	
Party	Votes	%	±pp	Won	+/−
Democrats for Andorra (DA)	307	100.00	New	14	▲14
Total	307	100.00		14	±0
Valid votes	307	53.95	N/A		
Blank votes	239	42.00	N/A		
Invalid votes	23	4.04	N/A		
Votes cast / turnout	569	69.05	▼14.28		
Registered voters	824				
Source: Government of Andorra

=== Encamp ===
Party	Vote			Seats	
Party	Votes	%	±pp	Won	+/−
Together for Progress + Democrats for Andorra (UP+DA)	1,252	72.83	▲30.83	10	▲7
Social Democratic Party + Independents (PS+I)	467	27.17	▼20.83	2	▼7
Total	1,719	100.00		12	±0
Valid votes	1,719	85.52	N/A		
Blank votes	248	12.34	N/A		
Invalid votes	43	2.14	N/A		
Votes cast / turnout	2,010	65.41	▼9.16		
Registered voters	3,073				
Source: Government of Andorra

=== Ordino ===
Party	Vote			Seats	
Party	Votes	%	±pp	Won	+/−
Ordino Communal Action + Democrats for Andorra (ACO+DA)	621	56.45	▲17.45	10	▲2
Convergents for Ordino (CD'O)	308	28.00	New	2	▲2
Social Democratic Party + Independents (PS+I)	171	15.55	▼26.45	0	▼2
Total	1,100	100.00		12	±0
Valid votes	1,100	94.50	N/A		
Blank votes	49	4.21	N/A		
Invalid votes	15	1.29	N/A		
Votes cast / turnout	1,164	65.41	▼8.89		
Registered voters	1,418				
Source: Government of Andorra

=== La Massana ===
Party	Vote			Seats	
Party	Votes	%	±pp	Won	+/−
Committed Citizens (CC)	779	48.30	New	9	▲9
Massana Movement (MM)	591	36.64	New	3	▲3
Social Democratic Party + Independents (PS+I)	243	27.17	▼26.93	0	▼3
Total	1,613	100.00		12	±0
Valid votes	1,613	91.60	N/A		
Blank votes	129	7.33	N/A		
Invalid votes	19	1.08	N/A		
Votes cast / turnout	1,761	74.21	▼4.79		
Registered voters	2,373				
Source: Government of Andorra

=== Andorra la Vella ===
Party	Vote			Seats	
Party	Votes	%	±pp	Won	+/−
Coalition of Independents (CD'I)	1,377	38.88	New	8	▲8
Democrats for Andorra (DA)	1,295	36.56	New	2	▲2
Social Democratic Party + Independents (PS+I)	870	24.56	▼29.44	2	▼7
Total	3,542	100.00		12	±0
Valid votes	3,542	91.43	N/A		
Blank votes	275	7.10	N/A		
Invalid votes	57	1.47	N/A		
Votes cast / turnout	3,874	57.12	▼6.88		
Registered voters	6,782				
Source: Government of Andorra

=== Sant Julià de Lòria ===
Party	Vote			Seats	
Party	Votes	%	±pp	Won	+/−
Lauredian Union + Democrats for Andorra + Independents (UL+DA+I)	1,232	64.00	▲5.00	10	±0
Social Democratic Party + Independents (PS+I)	693	36.00	▲21.00	2	▲2
Total	3,542	100.00		12	±0
Valid votes	1,925	85.67	N/A		
Blank votes	283	12.59	N/A		
Invalid votes	39	1.74	N/A		
Votes cast / turnout	2,247	69.33	▼4.37		
Registered voters	3,241				
Source: Government of Andorra

=== Escaldes-Engordany ===
Party	Vote			Seats	
Party	Votes	%	±pp	Won	+/−
Democrats for Andorra (DA) (Note: Compared with 2007 results of People's Union)	1,687	69.57	▼0.43	10	±0
Social Democratic Party + Independents (PS+I)	738	40.43	▲15.43	2	±0
Total	2,425	100.00		12	±0
Valid votes	2,425	84.44	N/A		
Blank votes	392	13.65	N/A		
Invalid votes	55	1.92	N/A		
Votes cast / turnout	2,872	61.50	▼11.30		
Registered voters	4,670				
Source: Government of Andorra
