= 2015 Andorran local elections =

The 2015 Andorran local elections were held on 13 December. Voters elected the council members of the seven parishes.

Winner by parish: Democrats for Andorra Committed Citizens Lauredia in Common

== Electoral system ==
Voters elect the members of the municipal councils (consells de comú in Catalan). The Electoral Law allows the municipal councils to choose their numbers of seats, which must be an even number between 10 and 16.

All city council members are elected in single multi-member districts, consisting of the whole parish, using closed lists. Half of the seats are allocated to the party with the most votes. The other half of the seats are allocated using the Hare quota (including the winning party). With this system the winning party obtains an absolute majority.

The cònsol major (mayor) and the cònsol menor (deputy mayor) are elected indirectly by the municipal councillors.

== Results ==
=== Overall ===
Party	Vote		Seats
Party	Votes	%	Won
Democrats for Andorra (DA)	4,968	37.11	45
Liberals of Andorra (LDA)	3,498	26.13	10
Social Democratic Party (PS)	2,022	15.10	5
Committed Citizens (CC)	1,330	9.93	11
Lauredia in Common (LC)	991	7.40	9
Common Sense (Social Democracy and Progress) (SDP)	580	4.33	0
Blank/invalid ballots	1,860	12.20	
Total	15,249	Turnout 60.78	80
Source: results, Commission

=== Canillo ===
Party	Vote		Seats
Party	Votes	%	Won
Democrats for Andorra + Independents (DA+Ind)	328	100.00	10
Blank/invalid ballots	241	42.36	
Total	569	Turnout 62.18	10
Source: https://web.archive.org/web/20160122023754/http://www.eleccions.ad/escrutini

=== Encamp ===
Party	Vote		Seats
Party	Votes	%	Won
Together for Progress + Democrats for Andorra (UP+DA)	830	42.22	8
Liberals of Andorra + Independents (LDA+Ind)	632	32.15	2
Social Democratic Party + Independents (PS+I)	504	25.64	2
Blank/invalid ballots	187	8.69	
Total	2 153	Turnout 61.89	12
Source: http://www.eleccions.ad/

=== Ordino ===
Party	Vote		Seats
Party	Votes	%	Won
Ordino Communal Action + Democrats for Andorra (ACO+DA)	640	58.66	8
Liberals of Andorra + Independents (LD'A+I)	451	41.34	2
Blank/invalid ballots	149	12.01	
Total	1 240	Turnout 76.30	10
Source: https://web.archive.org/web/20160122023754/http://www.eleccions.ad/escrutini

=== La Massana ===
Party	Vote		Seats
Party	Votes	%	Won
Committed Citizens (CC)	1 330	77.55	11
Democrats for Andorra (DA)	385	22.45	1
Blank/invalid ballots	176	9.31	
Total	1891	Turnout 68.93	12
Source: https://web.archive.org/web/20160122023754/http://www.eleccions.ad/escrutini

=== Andorra la Vella ===
Party	Vote		Seats
Party	Votes	%	Won
Democrats for Andorra + Independents (DA+I)	1 289	35.74	8
Social Democratic Party + Independents (PS+I)	996	27.61	2
Coalition of Independents + Liberals of Andorra (CDI+LDA)	904	25.06	2
Common Sense + Social Democracy and Progress + Independents (SC+SDP+Ind)	418	11.59	0
Blank/invalid ballots	395	9.87	
Total	4 002	Turnout 53.09	12
Source: http://www.eleccions.ad/

=== Sant Julià de Lòria ===
Party	Vote		Seats
Party	Votes	%	Won
Lauredia in Common (LC)	991	50.36	9
Liberals of Andorra + Lauredian Union (LDA+UL)	977	49.64	3
Blank/invalid ballots	458	18.88	
Total	2426	Turnout 66.26	12

=== Escaldes-Engordany ===
Party	Vote		Seats
Party	Votes	%	Won
Democrats for Andorra (DA)	1 487	54.97	10
Liberals of Andorra (LDA)	534	19.74	1
Social Democratic Party + Independents (PS+I)	522	19.30	1
Common Sense + Social Democracy and Progress + Independents (SC+SDP+Ind)	162	5.99	0
Blank/invalid ballots	274	9.20	
Total	2979	Turnout 57.86	12
