= 2015 Andorran parliamentary election =

- 1 March 2015
- All 28 seats in the General Council
Party	Leader	Vote %	Seats	+/–
DA	Antoni Martí	37.03	15	−5
PLA	Josep Pintat Forné	27.69	8	New
PS	Pere López Agràs	23.53	3	−3
SDP	Víctor Naudi	11.75	2	New
This lists parties that won seats. See the complete results below.
Results by parish
Prime Minister before	Prime Minister after
Antoni Martí; DA	Antoni Martí; DA

Parliamentary elections were held in Andorra on 1 March 2015. Despite losing five seats, the Democrats for Andorra retained their majority in the General Council, winning 15 of the 28 seats.

== Electoral system ==
The 28 members of the General Council were elected by two methods; 14 members were elected in two-member constituencies based on the seven parishes, whilst the remaining 14 were elected in a single nationwide constituency by proportional representation, with seats allocated using the largest remainder method.

== Opinion polls ==
Pollster	Date	DA	PS	Vd'A	ApC	SPD	LDA	Others	Lead
Election results	1 March 2015	39.4	23.6		–	9.5	27.5		11.8
CRES	26 January 2015	47.5	24.4			10.6	17.5		23.1
CRES	30 April 2014	53.2	29.4			7.9		9.5	23.8
2011 elections	3 April 2011	55.1	34.8	3.4	6.7				20.3

== Results ==
The Democrats for Andorra ran in alliance with United for Progress in Encamp, Communal Action of Ordino in Ordino, Massana Movement in La Massana, and the Coalition of Independents in Andorra la Vella. The Liberal Party ran in alliance with independent candidates in Encamp, Ordino and La Massana, and the Lauredian Union in Sant Julià de Lòria.

Party	PR			Constituency			Total seats	+/–
Party	Votes	%	Seats	Votes	%	Seats	Total seats	+/–
Democrats for Andorra	5,448	37.03	5	5,662	39.36	10	15	–5
Liberal Party of Andorra	4,073	27.69	4	3,962	27.54	4	8	New
PS+VERDS+IC+I	3,462	23.53	3	3,393	23.59	0	3	–3
Social Democracy and Progress	1,728	11.75	2	1,367	9.50	0	2	New
Total	14,711	100.00	14	14,384	100.00	14	28	0
Valid votes	14,711	91.46		14,384	89.49			
Invalid/blank votes	1,373	8.54		1,689	10.51			
Total votes	16,084	100.00		16,073	100.00			
Registered voters/turnout	24,512	65.62		24,512	65.57			
Source: Elections Andorra

=== By parish ===
Parish	Constituency				PR			
Parish	DA	LDA	PS	SDP	DA	LDA	PS	SDP
Canillo	80.7	–	19.3	–	56.6	22.1	12.9	8.5
Encamp	37.5	24.0	30.4	8.1	40.5	22.9	26.9	9.7
Ordino	37.8	36.3	19.4	6.6	36.5	31.1	23.2	9.3
La Massana	33.1	44.7	22.2	–	35.7	36.5	20.0	7.8
Andorra la Vella	36.8	20.7	25.7	16.7	34.5	27.6	22.1	15.9
Sant Julià de Lòria	29.8	47.5	14.9	7.9	24.3	48.2	19.1	8.4
Escaldes-Engordany	49.0	13.9	26.2	10.9	45.2	16.8	23.8	14.2
Total	39.4	27.5	23.6	9.5	37.0	27.7	23.5	11.7
