= Social Democracy and Progress =

Political party in Andorra

Social Democracy and Progress Socialdemocràcia i Progrés
- President: Josep Roig Carcel
- Founders: Víctor Naudi; Jaume Bartumeu
- Founded: May 2013
- Split from: Social Democratic Party
- Headquarters: Andorra la Vella
- Ideology: Social democracy
- Political position: Centre-left
- General Council: 0 / 28

Website
- www.sdpand.com

Social Democracy and Progress (Catalan: Socialdemocràcia i Progrés, SDP) is a social-democratic political party in Andorra led by Víctor Naudi.

== History ==
Established in May 2013, the PSD ran in the 2015 parliamentary elections. In the constituency elections the party received 9% of the vote and failed to win a seat. However, it also received 11% of the proportional representation vote, winning two seats. It lost both those seats in the 2019 elections.

== Election results ==
=== General Council elections ===
Election	Leader	Votes	%	Seats	+/–	Position	Status
2015	Víctor Naudi	1,728	11.75	2 / 28	New	4th	Opposition
2019	Josep Roig Carcel	1,044	5.87	0 / 28	▼2	▼5th	Extra-parliamentary
2023 (Note: In coalition with PS.)	Víctor Naudi	4,036	21.05	3 / 28	▲3	▲3rd	Opposition
