= Antoni Martí =

Andorran politician (1963–2023)

His Excellency Antoni Martí
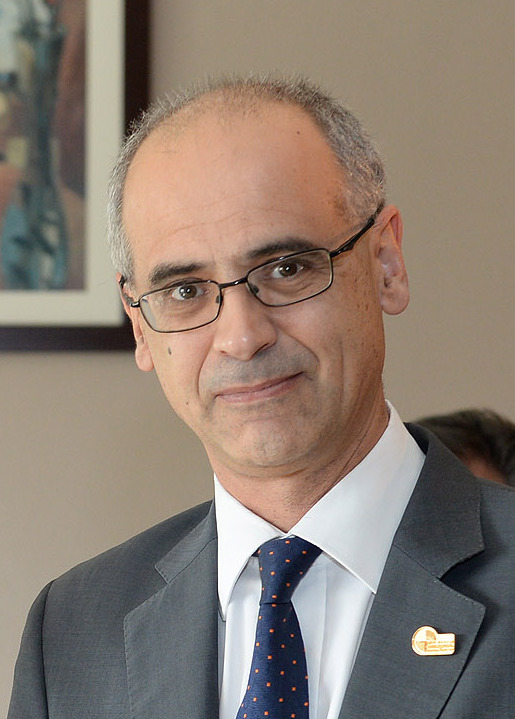
- Martí in 2014

Prime Minister of Andorra
- In office 1 April 2015 – 16 May 2019
- Monarchs: Episcopal co-prince: Joan Enric Vives Sicília; French co-prince: François Hollande; Emmanuel Macron
- Representative: Episcopal: Josep Maria Mauri; French: Thierry Lataste; Jean-Pierre Hugues; Patrick Strzoda
- Preceded by: Gilbert Saboya Sunyé (acting)
- Succeeded by: Xavier Espot Zamora
- In office 12 May 2011 – 23 March 2015
- Monarchs: Episcopal co-prince: Joan Enric Vives Sicília; French co-prince: Nicolas Sarkozy; François Hollande
- Representative: Episcopal: Nemesi Marqués Oste; Josep Maria Mauri; French: Christian Frémont; Sylvie Hubac; Thierry Lataste
- Preceded by: Pere López Agràs (acting)
- Succeeded by: Gilbert Saboya Sunyé (acting)

Personal details
- Born: 30 July 1963 Escaldes-Engordany, Andorra
- Died: 6 November 2023 (aged 60) Escaldes-Engordany, Andorra
- Party: Democrats for Andorra
- Spouse: Lidia Baez
- Education: ENSA Toulouse

Antoni Martí Petit (Catalan: [ənˈtɔni məɾˈti pəˈtit]; 30 July 1963 – 6 November 2023) was an Andorran architect and politician who served as the prime minister of Andorra between 2011 and 2019, when he was elected on the ticket of the Democrats for Andorra.

Previously, Martí had served as a member of the General Council of Andorra between 1993 and 2003, and as mayor (cònsol major) of Escaldes-Engordany between 2003 and 2011.

As prime minister, Martí achieved a reform of Andorran taxation for greater economic openness and international transparency. In addition, he oversaw the law that allowed same-sex civil unions, reactivated the Andorra-La Seu d'Urgell Airport, managed the financial scandal caused by the Banca Privada d'Andorra, promoted the first major negotiations for Andorra's association agreement with the European Union and signed the agreement introducing the euro in Andorra.

== Early life ==
Antoni Martí Petit was born in Escaldes-Engordany on 30 July 1963. He studied at the École nationale supérieure d'architecture de Toulouse (Toulouse National School of Architecture), part of the Université fédérale de Toulouse Midi-Pyrénées. He was an architect by profession.

Martí was first elected to the General Council in 1993, the first parliamentary election to involve political parties, as a member of the Liberal Union, party of which he was a co-founder. He was re-elected in the 1997 election and in the 2001 election, when the Liberal Union was renamed as the Liberal Party of Andorra (PLA).

In 2003, Martí resigned from the General Council to stand in that year's local elections for the mayoralty of Escaldes-Engordany. He resulted elected as mayor and served two consecutive terms as mayor, from 2003 to 2011. Before the end of his first mandate, he left the PLA and founded his own platform called Unió pel Poble (Union for the People). Of his legacy as mayor, the salvation of the spa resort Caldea, the protection of the Madriu Valley and the consolidation of the Clot d'Emprivat area stand out.

== Prime Minister of Andorra ==
=== First term: 2011–2015 ===
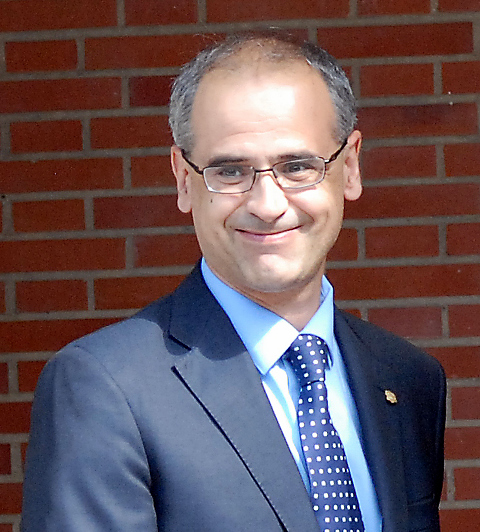
Martí in an official visit to Spain, 4 July 2011

After days of negotiation and uncertainty, on 17 February 2011 Martí announced that he was standing as the candidate for the centrist coalition (Democrats for Andorra) on the national list for the 2011 early elections. He resigned as mayor of Escaldes-Engordany on 22 February and was succeeded by Montserrat Capdevila on 5 March.

On 3 April 2011, Democrats for Andorra (DA) won an overwhelming absolute majority, achieving the 55.15% of the vote and winning 21 seats in the General Council.

The General Council session to inaugurate Martí as prime minister took place on 11 May 2011, and he announced that his main objectives for his mandate were economic recovery, the promotion of tourism and the country's rapprochement with the European Union while offering state agreements with the opposition on issues such as the Andorra-EU relationship, social security and local administration. Martí won 21 votes in favour and 6 abstentions for his appointment, and was sworn in the following day.

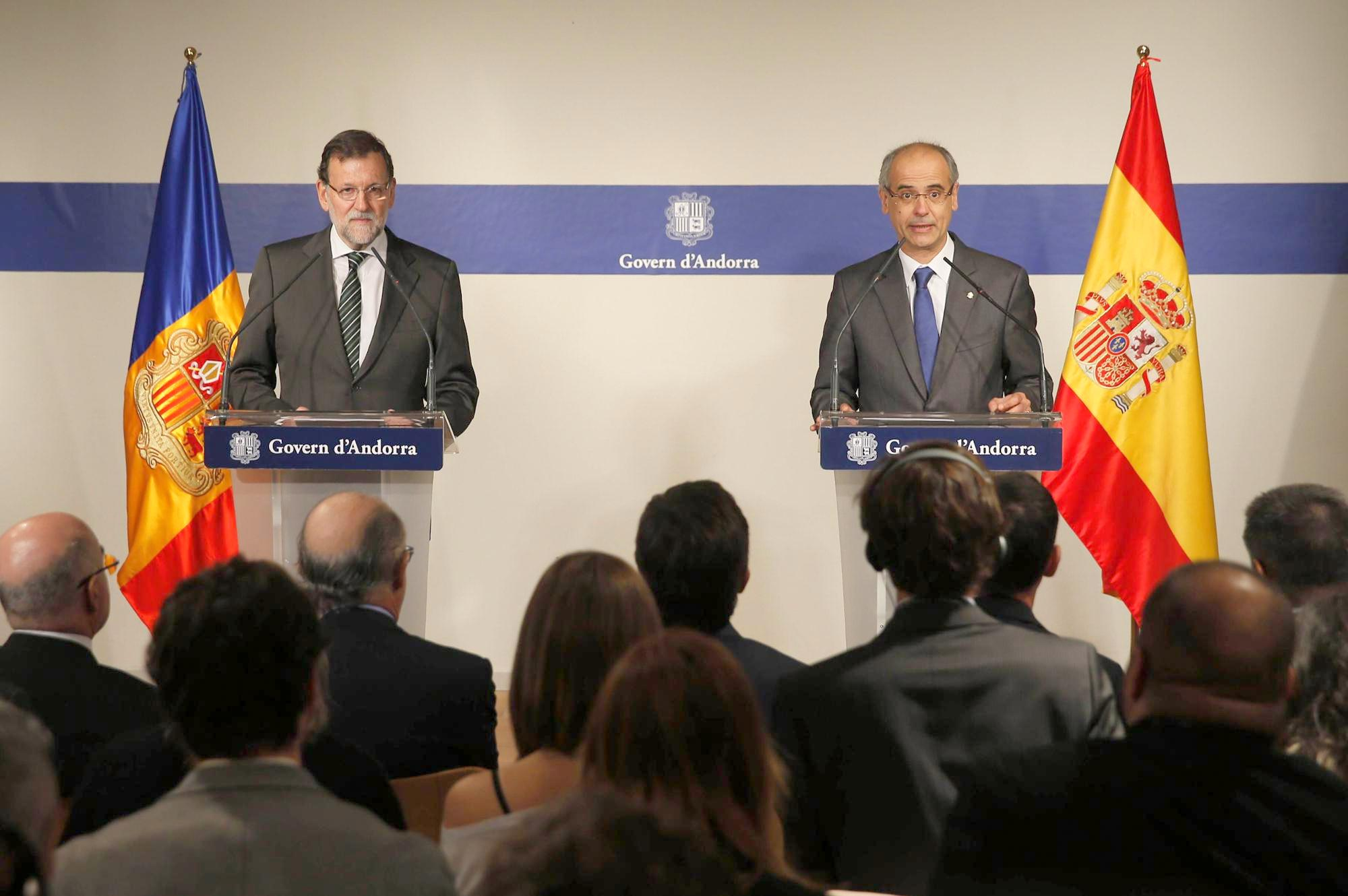
Martí with Spanish prime minister Mariano Rajoy, January 2015

The first five measures that the Martí government approved were: the flexibilisation of business hours, the revision of the land law, the revision of the law on income tax for non-resident taxpayers, the reduction of contributions for the self-employed and the urgent processing of several commitments that Andorra must take for the evaluation of the Council of Europe's Committee of Experts on the Evaluation of Anti-Money Laundering Measures and the Financing of Terrorism.

During the negotiations with the European Union, Andorra changed its foreign investment law, opening the country up to foreign investors, and also signed an agreement with France, Portugal and Spain to avoid double taxation.

Martí also oversaw the introduction of the euro as the official currency of Andorra, following an agreement which was completed in June 2011. Andorra was permitted to issue their own euros from July 2013, but due to various delays, Andorran euros did not enter circulation until January 2015. In late May 2013, Martí met with François Hollande, the president of France and a co-prince of Andorra, to inform him of his intentions to bring in a law to introduce personal income tax in Andorra. Hollande encouraged Martí to continue with economic reforms that may lead to growth. In June 2013, Martí bowed to pressure from the European Union and did introduce a personal income tax for Andorrans despite opposing it during the 2011 election campaign.

In 2014, the General Council passed the government's first law regulating gambling, and the government awarded the first license to open a casino.

=== Second term: 2015–2019 ===
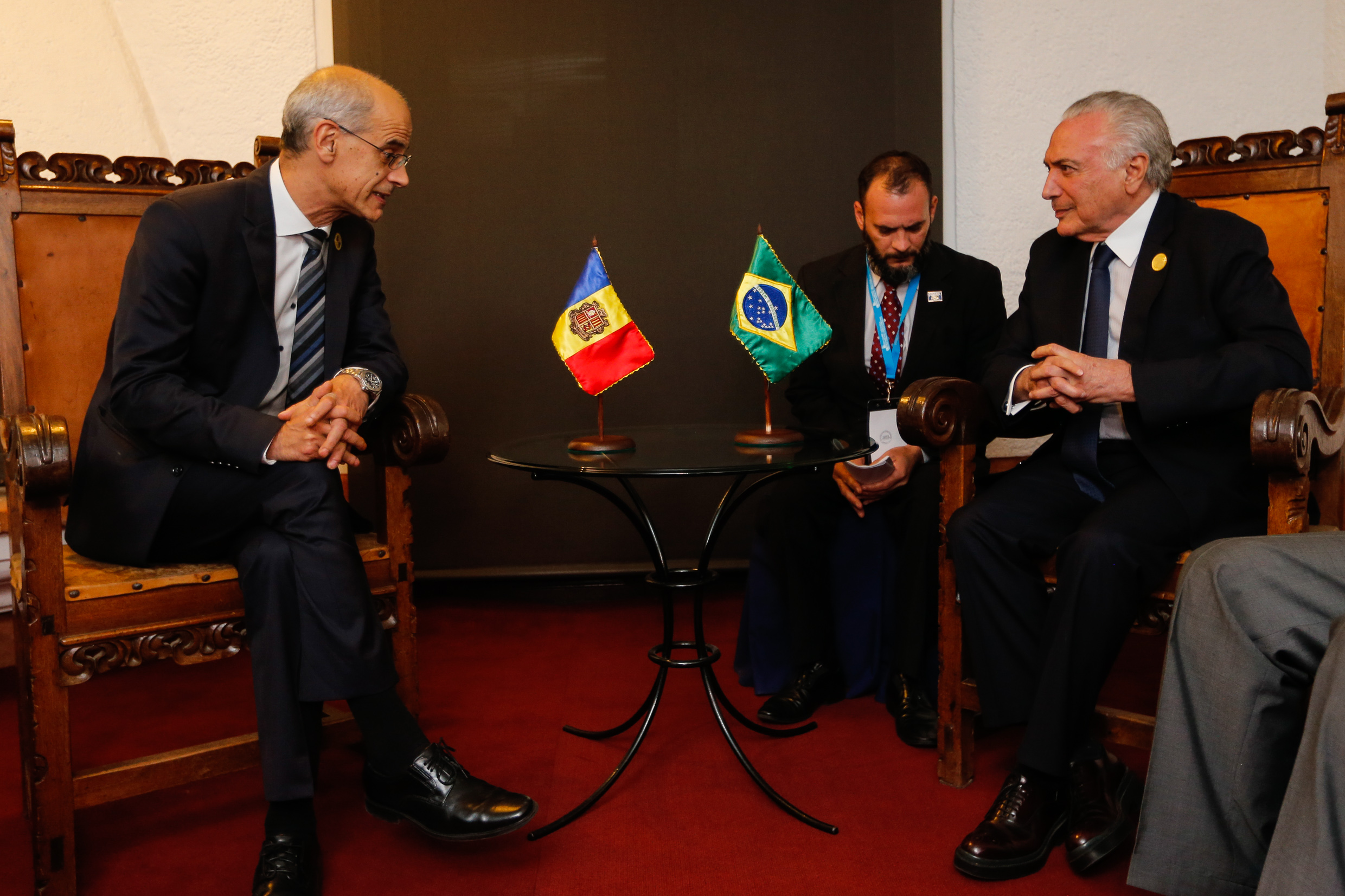
Martí with Brazilian president Michel Temer, 15 November 2018

Democrats for Andorra, again led by Martí, again won an absolute majority in the 2015 election, although it lost five seats. He was re-elected prime minister on 30 March 2015 and was sworn in the following day. He succeeded Gilbert Saboya Sunyé, who took over as interim prime minister on 23 March after Martí delegated the functions to him by decree on 18 March.

A few days after the election, on 10 March 2015 the US Treasury Department issued a report stating that the bank Banca Privada d'Andorra (BPA) was a "primary money laundering concern", involving four US correspondent banks, criminal groups in Russia and China, and Venezuelan money launderers. The board of directors and three of the bank's managers were suspended as of 11 March 2015 by the Institut Nacional Andorrà de Finances under orders of the Andorran government. Martí, while being acting prime minister, reported that the US authorities had informed him days before and that it was a case of "bad practices and not a situation of solvency risk or balance sheet problems", calling on the citizens to remain calm, as the government had appointed two auditors to "guarantee the continuity of the institution's normal operations, protect its customers and ensure the good name and integration of the Andorran financial centre". On 16 March, the government, by means of a temporary decree, limited the withdrawal movements of funds, causing a corralito for bPA customers. In June 2016, Martí praised Michel Camdessus's 2005 report about Andorra, that "turned out to be prophetic." In turn, Camdessus expressed his respect for "the government of Andorra for the fact that the Principality embarked on the path of reforms, turning from protectionism and stagnation in the direction of openness and competitiveness."

On 2 February 2016, Martí and the mixed parliamentary group and the parliamentary group of Democrats for Andorra signed the State Pact for the negotiations of an Association Agreement between Andorra and the European Union. In March 2017, Martí's government approved the proposal to reform the penal code to regulate tax crimes, the extension of the crime of smuggling to any type of goods; and the incorporation of the crimes of fraud against the Caixa Andorrana de Seguretat Social, punishable insolvency, illegal financing of political parties and the squandering of public funds as crimes of money laundering. The proposal was adopted by the General Council in July.

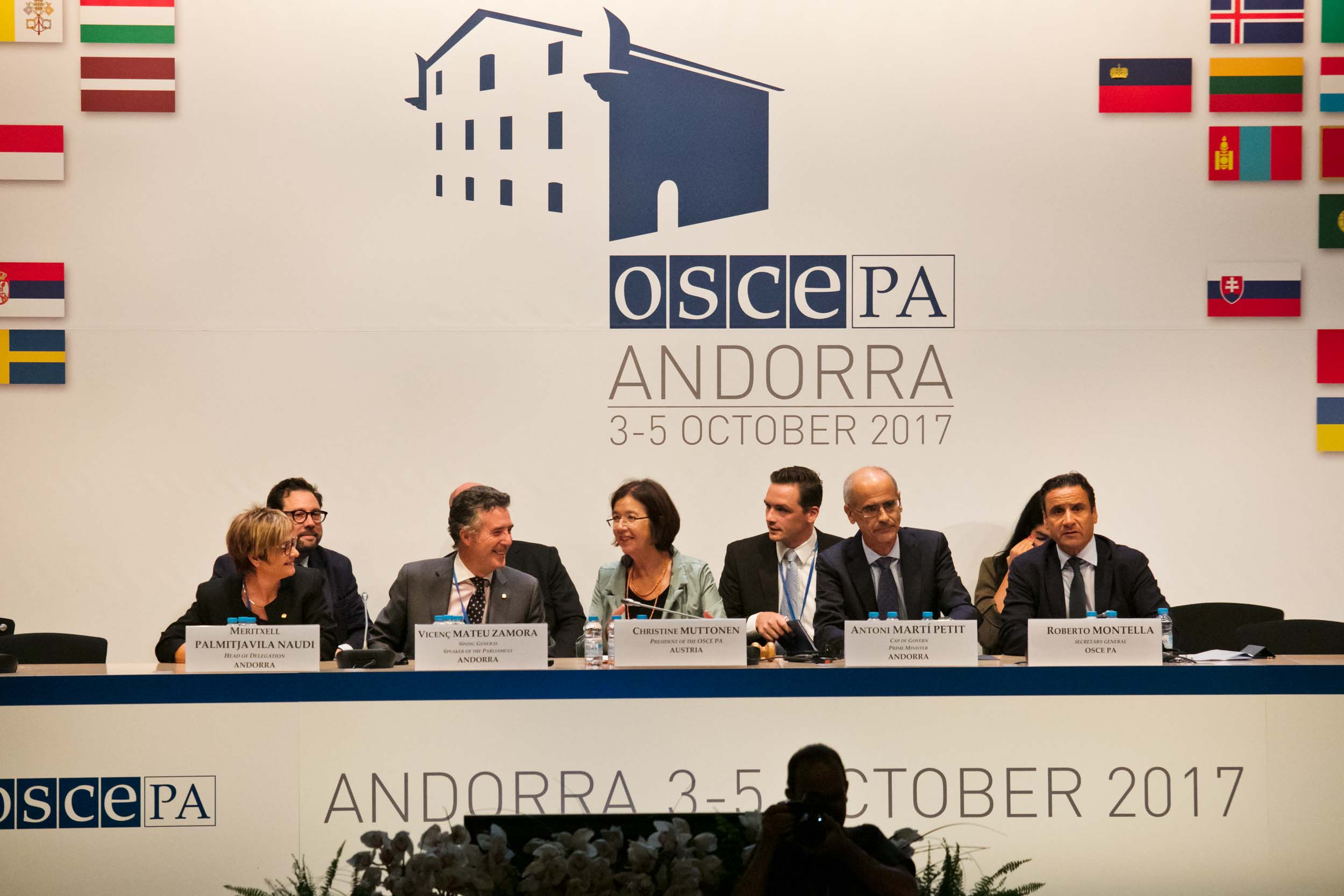
Martí (second from left) in the Parliamentary Assembly of the OSCE session in Andorra la Vella, 3 October 2017

In October 2016, while an official visit to San Marino, Martí defended a common strategy between Andorra, Monaco and San Marino for the association agreement with the European Union.

Following the terrorist attacks in Barcelona and Cambrils on 17 August 2017, Martí offered a grand bargain to the opposition to provide the Police Corps with more troops and create a specific counter-terrorism unit. The opposition rejected the proposal for such a specific unit and in September of that year it was made public that a police unit with anti-terrorist activity already existed for at least a year and a half to monitor a young man in the country who was in the process of radicalisation and had travelled to Syria.

When the President of the Generalitat de Catalunya Carles Puigdemont declared Catalonia's independence from Spain, only to suspend it shortly afterwards, on 10 October 2017, Martí acknowledged that, although he stated that he had never proposed himself as mediator to the Spanish Prime Minister Mariano Rajoy, he did have telephone contacts with both parties to discuss the constitutional crisis. In May 2018 he called for a "political solution" to end the conflict, although he preferred not to comment on the judicial decisions that led to the imprisonment of some Catalan pro-independence leaders.

In his last address to the General Council as prime minister, Martí stated that decriminalising abortion was incompatible with maintaining the country's political system.

In the 2019 negotiations of the Association Agreement, Martí argued for Andorra to have an exception in the free movement of persons, and thus maintain the quota system. In February 2019, the Spanish newspaper Okdiario and the Andorran newspaper La Valira linked him to a corruption scheme in which Martí had allegedly received illegal commissions for a businessman to obtain the award of the first casino in the country. Martí denied it and subsequently denounced the two newspapers.

In view of the elections in 2019, Martí named Xavier Espot as his successor to the leadership of Democrats for Andorra and candidate for prime minister. Following DA's victory in those elections, on 16 May 2019 Martí was succeeded as prime minister by Espot.

=== Post-premiership ===
After his mandate, he left the political front line and returned to his work as an architect. In December 2019 Martí left his membership in the Democrats for Andorra, although he remained a sympathiser.

On 4 October 2023, the extraordinary meeting of the Pact of State for the negotiations of an Association Agreement between Andorra and the European Union agreed to appoint Martí, together with Jaume Bartumeu, as an observer member of the negotiations as one of the first leaders to promote the country's rapprochement with the European Union.

== Personal life ==
Martí was married to Lídia Báez, a Dominican Republic national with whom he had three children.

Following a cardiac arrest in his home, Martí died at Nostra Senyora de Meritxell Hospital on 6 November 2023, at the age of 60. The Andorran government decreed two days of national mourning. The state funeral took place on 8 November in the parish church of Saint Peter Martyr in Escaldes-Engordany and was presided by the episcopal co-Prince Joan Enric Vives i Sicília.

== Honors ==
- Grand Cross of the Order of Saint Agatha (San Marino, 2016)

Political offices
Preceded by Pere López Agràs; Acting	Prime Minister of Andorra; 2011–2015	Succeeded by Gilbert Saboya Sunyé; Acting
Preceded by Gilbert Saboya Sunyé; Acting	Prime Minister of Andorra; 2015–2019	Succeeded by Xavier Espot Zamora
