= 2019 Andorran parliamentary election =

- 7 April 2019
- All 28 seats in the General Council
Party	Leader	Vote %	Seats	+/–
DA	Xavier Espot Zamora	35.13	11	−4
PS	Pere López Agràs	30.62	2	−1
L'A	Jordi Gallardo	12.48	4	−2
TV–UL	Josep Pintat Forné	10.42	4	+2
PS–L'A	–	–	2	New
CC	David Baró Riba	–	2	New
This lists parties that won seats. See the complete results below.
Results by parish and national list
Prime Minister before	Prime Minister after
Antoni Martí; DA	Xavier Espot Zamora; DA

Parliamentary elections were held in Andorra on 7 April 2019, electing all 28 seats of the General Council. Although they remained the largest party, the Democrats for Andorra lost their parliamentary majority after losing four seats. The Social Democratic Party gained four seats, becoming the second-largest party.

== Background ==
Democrats for Andorra secured an absolute majority in the 2015 election and Antoni Martí was re-elected Prime Minister of Andorra. In December 2017, Josep Pintat Forné, together with the two members of the Lauredian Union and two members of Committed Citizens, left the Liberal group.

Antoni Martí was unable to stand for reelection, as the Constitution limits the office to two complete consecutive terms.

== Electoral system ==
Twenty-eight general councillors (Catalan: consellers generals) are elected, based on closed party lists:

- Fourteen general councillors representing the seven parishes (two councillors per parish) are elected from the list with most votes in each parish.
- Fourteen general councillors are elected from national lists using the largest remainder method of proportional representation.

The parish lists and the national list are independent of one another: the same person cannot appear on both the national list and on a parish list, and voters cast two separate ballots. There is no requirement to vote for the same party for both lists.

== Parties and leaders ==
=== Nationwide constituency ===
The following parties or coalitions are running in the election:

Party or coalition	PM Candidate	Current seats	2015 election
Democrats for Andorra (DA)	Xavier Espot Zamora	15	15
Liberals of Andorra (L'A)	Jordi Gallardo Fernández	3	8
Social Democratic Party (PS)	Pere López i Agràs	3	3
Social Democracy and Progress (SDP)	Josep Roig Carcel	2	2
Third Way: Third Way; Lauredian Union (UL); Independents	Josep Pintat Forné	5	– (integrated in L'A)
Sovereign Andorra (AS)	Eusebi Nomen Calvet	–	–
United for the Progress of Andorra (UPA)	Alfons Clavera Arizti	–	–

=== Parish constituencies ===
The following table displays the parties or coalitions running at each parish:

Party or coalition	Canillo	Encamp	Ordino	La Massana	Andorra la Vella	Sant Julià de Lòria	Escaldes-Engordany
Democrats for Andorra (DA)	check	check	check		check	check	check
In agreement: Liberals of Andorra (L'A); Social Democratic Party (PS)	check	check	check	check	check	check	check
Social Democracy and Progress (SDP)		check	check		check		check
Third Way: Third Way; Lauredian Union (UL); Independents		check	check		check	check	check
Sovereign Andorra (AS)	check						
Committed Citizens (CC)				check			

== Opinion polls ==
Polling firm	Fieldwork date	Sample size	DA	L'A	PS	Vd'A	SDP	Podem	TV	AS	UPA	Lead
Time Consultants	7–18 Mar 2019	680	34.1	16.2	30.2	–	3.8	–	8.6	2.9	1.2	3.9
CRES	28 Feb–13 Mar 2019	1,212	38.7	16.0	28.9	–	5.2	–	6.2	3.1	1.1	9.8
Time Consultants	1–10 Oct 2018	680	34.4	19.9	36.3		8.0	1.4	–	–	–	2.1
CRES	4–21 Jun 2018	809	33.1	21.7	35.3	1.5	7.7	–	–	–	–	2.3
CRES	3–25 May 2017	803	37.9	27.4	21.0	5.6	4.8	–	–	–	–	10.5
CRES	16 May–30 Jun 2016	1,215	42.0	20.8	26.9	–	6.4	–	–	–	–	15.2
2015 election	1 March 2015	–	37.0	27.7	23.5		11.7	–	–	–	–	9.4

== Results ==
Party	PR			Constituency			Total seats	+/–
Party	Votes	%	Seats	Votes	%	Seats	Total seats	+/–
Democrats for Andorra	6,248	35.13	5	5,931	34.86	6	11	–4
Social Democratic Party	5,445	30.62	5	6,473	38.05	2	7	+4
Liberal Party of Andorra	2,219	12.48	2	6,473	38.05	2	4	–4
Third Way–Lauredian Union	1,853	10.42	2	2,122	12.47	2	4	+2
Social Democracy and Progress	1,044	5.87	0	1,280	7.52	0	0	–2
Sovereign Andorra	825	4.64	0	71	0.42	0	0	New
United for the Progress of Andorra	149	0.84	0	0	0.00	–	0	New
Committed Citizens	0	0.00	–	1,136	6.68	2	2	New
Total	17,783	100.00	14	17,013	100.00	14	28	0
Valid votes	17,783	95.41		17,013	91.35			
Invalid votes	324	1.74		443	2.38			
Blank votes	531	2.85		1,168	6.27			
Total votes	18,638	100.00		18,624	100.00			
Registered voters/turnout	27,278	68.33		27,278	68.27			
Source: Elections Andorra

=== By parish ===
Parish	Constituency						PR						
Parish	DA	PS+L'A	TV	CC	SDP	AS	DA	PS	L'A	TV	SDP	AS	UPA
Canillo	66.3	23.1				10.6	55.9	20	9.4	5.6	2.6	6.5	0.6
Encamp	44.6	42.1	4.9		8.5		37.9	32.3	16.1	4.3	5.5	3.9	1.0
Ordino	44.6	40.2	7.3		7.9		37.2	31.7	12.7	6.8	5.2	6.4	0.5
La Massana		43.9		56.1			36.1	26.6	14.1	12.8	4.4	6.1	0.7
Andorra la Vella	37.0	37.3	10.7		14.9		30.3	37.0	12.6	7.2	8.7	4.3	1.3
Sant Julià de Lòria	27.5	27.8	44.7				26.6	24.6	10.5	30.0	4.9	3.3	0.5
Escaldes-Engordany	41.4	42.6	7.6		8.5		42.5	30.7	11.5	5.5	5.0	4.8	0.7
Total	34.8	38.1	12.5	6.7	7.5	0.4	35.1	30.6	12.4	10.4	5.8	6.4	0.8

== Government formation ==
Three parties eventually formed a governing coalition, composed of the Democrats, the Liberal Party and Committed Citizens with Xavier Espot Zamora as Prime Minister.
