= Xavier Espot Zamora =

Prime Minister of Andorra since 2019

His Excellency Xavier Espot Zamora
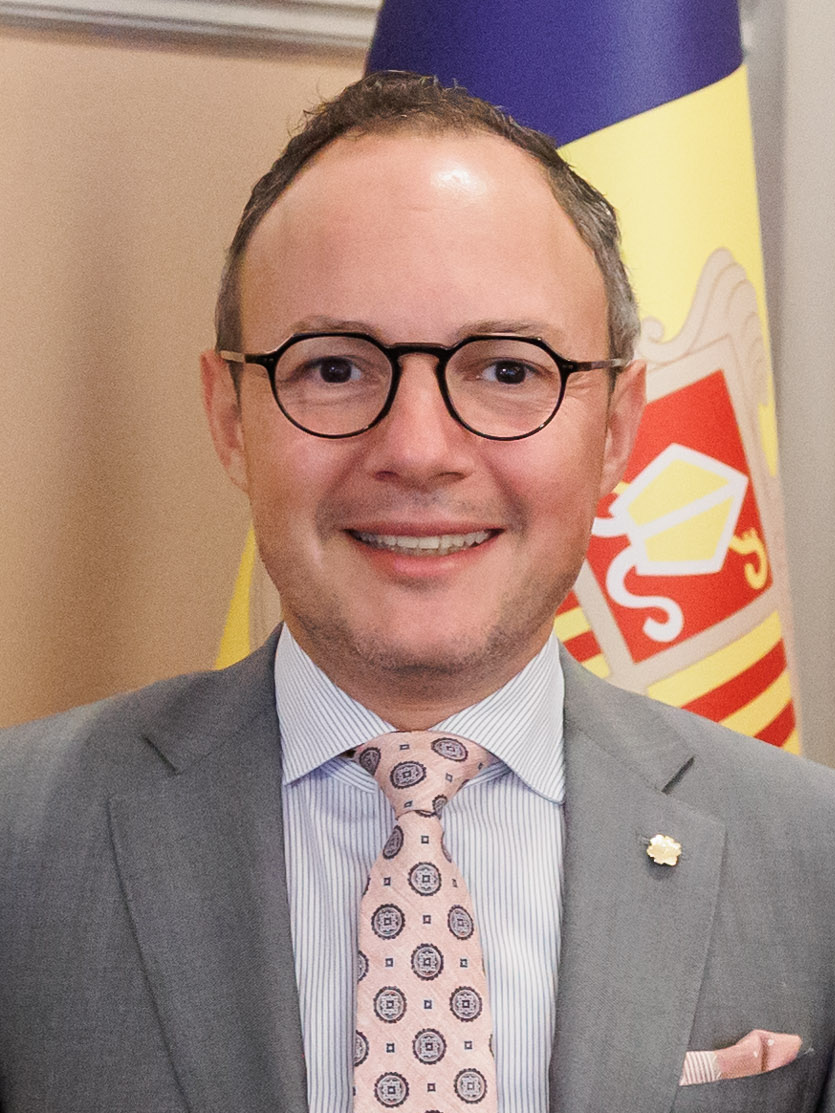
- Espot in 2024

Prime Minister of Andorra
- Incumbent
- Assumed office 16 May 2019
- Monarchs: Episcopal Co-prince: Joan Enric Vives Sicília (until 2025); Josep-Lluís Serrano Pentinat (2025–present); French Co-prince: Emmanuel Macron
- Representative: Episcopal: Josep Maria Mauri (2019–2023); Eduard Ibáñez Pulido (2023–present); French: Patrick Strzoda (2019–2024); Patrice Faure (2024–2025); Georges-François Leclerc (2025–2026); Frédéric Rose (2026–present)
- Preceded by: Antoni Martí

President of Democrats for Andorra
- Incumbent
- Assumed office 15 June 2019
- Preceded by: Antoni Martí

Personal details
- Born: Xavier Espot Zamora; 30 October 1979 (age 47) Escaldes-Engordany, Andorra
- Party: Democrats for Andorra
- Education: ESADE (LL.B., LL.M.); University Ramon Llull (BA)

Xavier Espot Zamora (born 30 October 1979) is an Andorran judge and politician who has served as Prime Minister of Andorra and President of the Democrats for Andorra since 2019. He previously served as Minister of Social Affairs, Justice, and the Interior from 2012 to 2019. A trained lawyer, Espot began his professional career as a court clerk and later served as a judge in various sections of the Andorran judiciary.

== Early life and judicial career ==
Xavier Espot Zamora was born on the 30 October 1979 in Escaldes-Engordany, Andorra. He is the son of Xavier Espot Miró, a former minister for the Social Democratic Party, and Melània Zamora Bonet, a businesswoman and doctor who died in 2019 at the age of 66. His maternal grandmother was Júlia Bonet Fité, the president and founder of Perfumeria Júlia. Espot has a younger sister.

Espot completed his primary and secondary education at the Lycée Comte de Foix and the Collège Alpin Beau Soleil in Switzerland. He holds a Bachelor of Laws degree and a Master of Laws from the Faculty of Law at the ESADE Business School. Additionally, he obtained a degree in Humanities from the Faculty of Philosophy at University Ramon Llull in Barcelona.

Espot began his professional career as a court clerk from September 2004 to June 2008, later serving at the Tribunal Superior de la Justícia (High Court of Andorra) between July and December 2008. He also held the position of batlle (judge), working in the civil, juvenile, and former investigative sections. From January to May 2009, he trained as a judge at the Tribunal de Grande Instance in Toulouse, France and also served at the courts of first instance in Barcelona.

== Political career ==
His political career began in 2011 when he joined the Government of Andorra as Secretary of State for Justice and the Interior. Under Prime Minister Antoni Martí, he served as Minister of Social Affairs, Justice, and the Interior from 25 July 2012 to 28 February 2019, succeeding Rosa Ferrer Obiols and holding all three portfolios. On 28 February 2019, he resigned from the government to prepare his candidacy for Prime Minister in the 2019 general election as the lead candidate of Democrats for Andorra (DA). Following the election, Espot was formally elected president of the party during its 5th Ordinary Congress on 15 June 2019, succeeding Antoni Martí in that role.

== Prime Minister of Andorra (2019–present) ==
Espot won the 2019 parliamentary election that took place on 7 April but lost their absolute majority in the General Council. On 12 May an agreement for a government coalition with Liberals of Andorra and Committed Citizens was announced. He was sworn in on 16 May 2019.

As Prime Minister, Espot tried to diversify Andorra's economy by making a deal with Grifols to build an Immunology Research Center. However, the deal was mutually terminated. Opposition, including the leader of the Social Democratic Party Pere Baró, accused the Prime Minister of hiding behind the Minister of Presidency, Economy, Labor, and Housing Conxita Marsol and the Minister of Health Helena Mas without explaining why the project failed.

He was re-elected as the DA party leader during the 8th Ordinary Congress on 13 September 2023.

== Personal life ==
On 11 September 2023, Espot Zamora came out as gay in an interview with Ràdio Nacional d'Andorra.

== Honors and awards ==
- Commander of the Order of Legion of Honour
- Commander of the Order of Charlemagne
- Grand Cross of the Order of Saint Agatha

== See also ==
- Executive Council of Andorra
- List of openly LGBT heads of state and government
