= Jordi Gallardo =

Andorran politician

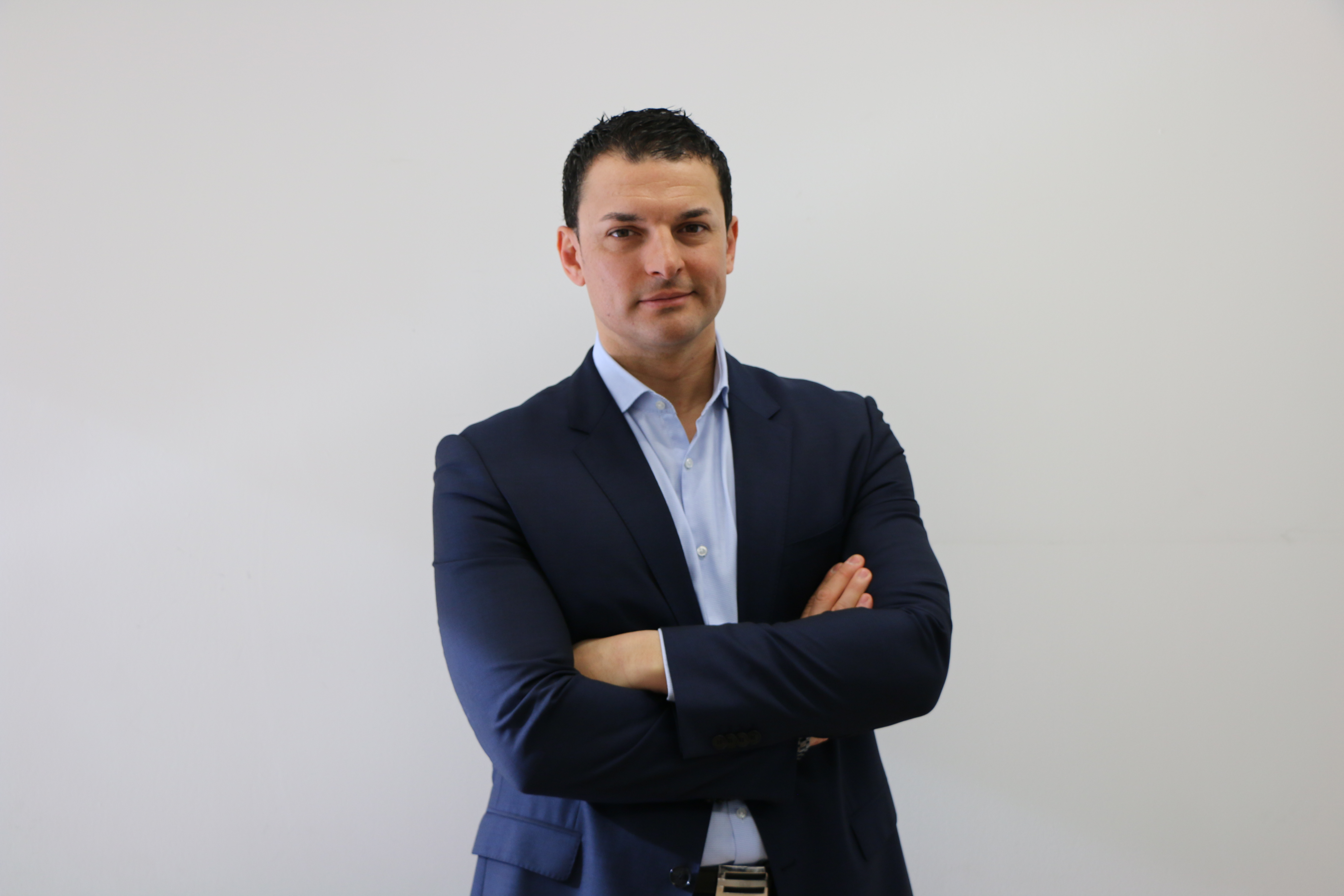
Jordi Gallardo

Jordi Gallardo (born 23 March 1976 in Andorra La Vella) is and Andorran economist, Minister of Economy in Andorra between 2019 and 2023.
