= Lauredian Union =

Lauredian Union Unió Laurediana
- Founded: 2001
- Headquarters: Sant Julià de Lòria
- Ideology: Localism; Conservatism
- Political position: Centre-right
- General Council: 0 / 28

Website
- https://uniolaurediana.com/ca/

The Lauredian Union (Catalan: Unió Laurediana, UL) is a political party in Andorra. Based in Sant Julià de Lòria, UL is localist and conservative. The party has formed coalitions in the General Council with the Democrats for Andorra and Liberals of Andorra, but did not field any candidates for the 2023 election.

== History ==
The Lauredian Union is centered in Sant Julià de Lòria. The Lauredian Union first contested national elections in 1997, when it was one of several local parties to form an alliance with the Liberal Union in the parliamentary elections that year. The UL failed to win a seat, but in the 2001 elections won two seats. The party did not contest the 2005 elections,

For the 2009 elections the party was part of the Reformist Coalition, which won 11 of the 28 seats. In the 2011 elections the party won two seats, and formed a coalition with the Democrats for Andorra. In the 2015 elections, the party returned to the Liberal camp but soon formed a 'third way' coalition alongside the Third Way party and several Independents for the 2019 elections. The coalition received 1,853 votes and won four seats.

In 2022, Democrats for Andorra and Liberals of Andorra made an electoral pact against the Lauredian Union. The Lauredian Union did not field any candidates in the 2023 election. The Lauredian Union won every election in Sant Julià de Lòria from 1999 to 2023, with the exception of the 2015 municipal elections. It lost the 2023 municipal elections to Awakening Lauredia and only received 3 of the 12 seats.

== Works cited ==
=== News ===
- Noya, Bru; Solanelles, Toni (13 February 2023). "El cap de setmana que ha sacsejat Unió Laurediana". Altaveu. Archived from the original on 26 April 2025.
- Noya, Bru (28 December 2022). "Liberals i Demòcrates tanquen pactes preelectorals que a Sant Julià poden torpedinar Unió Laurediana". Altaveu. Archived from the original on 26 April 2025.

=== Web ===
- "Municipal Elections 2023". Andorra. Archived from the original on 23 April 2025.
