= Social Democratic Party (Andorra) =

Social Democratic Party Partit Socialdemòcrata
- Abbreviation: PS
- President: Pere Baró
- First Secretary: Marta Pujol
- Founded: June 2000
- Split from: National Democratic Group
- Headquarters: C/Verge del Pilar, 5 3-1; Andorra la Vella
- Ideology: Social democracy
- Political position: Centre-left
- European affiliation: Party of European Socialists (observer)
- International affiliation: Socialist International
- Colours: Red
- General Council: 3 / 28

Website
- http://www.psa.ad/

The Social Democratic Party (Catalan: Partit Socialdemòcrata, PS) is a social-democratic political party in Andorra.

== History ==
The party was established in the run-up to the March 2001 parliamentary elections when the National Democratic Group split in two, with the Democratic Party also being formed. The new party received 28.7% of the vote and won six seats.

In the buildup to the April 2005 parliamentary elections the party formed an alliance named L'Alternativa with the Parochial Union of Independents Group (GUPI) and Democratic Renewal to contest parish-level seats. The party won six seats at the national level, whilst the alliance won six seats at the parish level. With a total of twelve seats, the party remained in opposition.

The April 2009 parliamentary elections saw the party renew its alliance with GUPI and some independents. The alliance won 14 of the 28 seats and PS leader Jaume Bartumeu became Prime Minister, with the Andorra for Change party supporting the government.

In 2010 the APC withdrew its support for the PS-led government, and in 2011 the General Council rejected the government's budget, forcing early elections. The April 2011 parliamentary elections saw the PS receive 34.8% of the vote, reducing its representation to six seats.

In the March 2015 parliamentary elections, the party ran in alliance with the Greens of Andorra, Citizens' Initiative and independent candidates. The alliance's vote share fell to 24%, winning only three seats.

== Election results ==
=== General Council elections ===
Election	Leader	Votes	%	Seats	+/–	Position	Status
2001	Jaume Bartumeu	3,083	28.7	6 / 28	New	▲2nd	Opposition
2005	Jaume Bartumeu	4,711	36.9	12 / 28	▲6	2nd	Opposition
2009	Jaume Bartumeu	6,610	45.0	14 / 28	▲2	▲1st	Majority
2011	Jaume Bartumeu	5,397	34.8	6 / 28	▼8	▼2nd	Opposition
2015	Pere López Agràs	3,462	23.5	3 / 28	▼3	▼3rd	Opposition
2019	Pere López Agràs	5,445	30.6	7 / 28	▲4	▲2nd	Opposition
2023 (Note: In coalition with SDP.)	Pere López Agràs	4,036	21.1	3 / 28	▼4	▼3rd	Opposition

=== Local elections ===
Election	Votes	%	Seats	+/–	Position
2003	3,695	33.8	21 / 82	New	2nd
2007	5,003	38.3	29 / 86	▲8	2nd
2011	3,182	25.2	8 / 86	▼21	2nd
2015	2,022	15.1	5 / 80	▼3	▼3rd
2019	3,987		15 / 80	▲10	
