= Democrats for Andorra =

Democrats for Andorra Demòcrates per Andorra
- Abbreviation: DA
- President: Xavier Espot Zamora
- Founder: Antoni Martí
- Founded: 22 February 2011
- Preceded by: Reformist Coalition
- Headquarters: C/Babot Camp, 13; Andorra la Vella
- Ideology: Liberal conservatism Civic nationalism
- Political position: Centre-right
- European affiliation: Alliance of Liberals and Democrats for Europe
- Colours: Orange
- General Council: 14 / 28

Website
- http://www.democrates.ad/

Democrats for Andorra (Catalan: Demòcrates per Andorra, DA) is a centre-right, liberal-conservative political party currently in government in Andorra.

The party was established on 22 February 2011 as the direct successor of the Reformist Coalition which ran in the 2009 election. Standing as main the opposition party in the 2011 Andorran parliamentary election, the Democrats for Andorra won 20 of the General Council's 28 seats, the largest majority since the passing of the Andorran Constitution in 1993.

The party was formed from a union of the Liberal Party of Andorra and New Centre, with elements of the Social Democratic Party, and is supported by Lauredian Union and Andorra for Change.

The party was led by Antoni Martí, who served as Prime Minister of Andorra between 2011 and 2019.

== Electoral results ==
=== General Council elections ===
Election	Leader	Votes	%	Seats	+/–	Position	Government
2011	Antoni Martí	8,553	55.15	20 / 28	20	1st	Majority
2015	Antoni Martí	5,448	37.03	15 / 28	▼5	1st	Majority
2019	Xavier Espot Zamora	6,248	35.13	11 / 28	▼4	1st	Coalition
2023	Xavier Espot Zamora	6,262	32.66	14 / 28	▲3	1st	Coalition

=== Local elections ===
Election	Votes	%	Seats	+/–	Position
2011	6,394	50.6	62 / 86	62	1st
2015	4,968	37.1	45 / 80	▼17	1st
2019	6,092	42.86	49 / 80	▲4	
2023	7,956	53.03	47 / 80	▼2	
