= 2027 Andorran parliamentary election =

- 26 May - 5 Jun 2027
- All 28 seats in the General Council; 15 seats needed for a majority
Party	Leader	Current seats
DA+CC	Xavier Espot	16
Concord	Cerni Escalé	5
PS	Pere Baró	3
Endavant	Carine Montaner	3
Acció	Judith Pallarés	1
Incumbent Prime Minister
Xavier Espot Zamora; DA

Parliamentary elections are expected to take place in Andorra no later than 5 June 2027. Incumbent prime minister Xavier Espot is incapable of running again due to the country's two term limit for the office.

== Background ==
The 2023 parliamentary elections resulted in a win for the ruling coalition of Democrats for Andorra (DA) and Committed Citizens (CC), which won an absolute majority of 16 seats, a gain of three. It was followed by the new Concord party, which won five seats. The progressive coalition formed by the Social Democratic Party (PS) and Social Democracy and Progress (SDP) came third with three seats, a loss of four. New parties Andorra Forward and Action for Andorra (Acció) won three and one seats respectively. Liberals of Andorra were left without parliamentary representation, losing the four seats they had.

== Electoral system ==
Twenty-eight general councillors (Catalan: consellers generals) are elected, based on closed party lists:

- Fourteen general councillors representing the seven parishes (two councillors per parish) are elected from the list with most votes in each parish.
- Fourteen general councillors are elected from national lists using the largest remainder method of proportional representation.

The parish lists and the national list are independent of one another: the same person cannot appear on both the national list and on a parish list, and voters cast two separate ballots. There is no requirement to vote for the same party for both lists.

The 1993 Constitution limits the number of full terms served by a prime minister to two.
