= 9th General Council =

General Council from 2023 election

←	8th	10th	→

Overview
- Legislative body: General Council
- Meeting place: New Parliament of Andorra, Carrer de la Vall, 11, AD500 Andorra la Vella
- Term: 26 April 2023 –
- Election: 2 April 2023
- Website: www.consellgeneral.ad

Councillors
- Members: 28
- General Syndic: Carles Enseñat Reig
- Deputy General Syndic: Sandra Codina Tort
- Majority leader: Jordi Jordana Rossell
- Leader of the Opposition: Cerni Escalé

The 9th General Council is the current meeting of the General Council, the unicameral parliament of Andorra, with the membership determined by the results of the parliamentary election held on 2 April 2023. The General Council met for the first time on 26 April 2023. According to the Constitution of Andorra the maximum legislative term of the congress is 4 years from the preceding election.

== Election ==
The 2023 Andorran parliamentary election under the 1993 Constitution was held on 2 April 2023. It saw the Democrats for Andorra (DA) gain a majority in the General Council, while three new parties (Concòrdia, Andorra Endavant and Acció) entered the General Council for the first time.

Alliance	Votes (PR)	%	Seats	+/−
DA–CC–ACO–UP	6,262	32.66	16	+3
Concòrdia	4,109	21.43	5	+5
PS–SDP	4,036	21.05	3	-5
Endavant	3,067	16.00	3	+3
L'A	893	4.66	0	-4
Acció	805	4.20	1	+1
Total	19,172	100.00	28	±0

== Government ==
Investiture; 10 May 2023
Candidate	Votes
Xavier Espot Zamora (DA): • Democrats for Andorra (14); • Committed Citizens (2); • Action for Andorra (1)	17 / 28
Abstentions: • Social Democratic Party (3); • Andorra Endavant (3)	6 / 28
Cerni Escalé Cabré (Concòrdia): • Concòrdia (5)	5 / 28

== Members ==
Electoral district	Councillor	Party
National list	Xavier Espot Zamora	Democrats for Andorra
National list	Meritxell López Guitart	Democrats for Andorra
National list	Carles Enseñat Reig	Democrats for Andorra
National list	Raul Ferré Bonet	Democrats for Andorra
National list	Carolina Puig Montes	Democrats for Andorra
National list	Cerni Escalé Cabré	Concòrdia
National list	Núria Segués Daina	Concòrdia
National list	Jordi Casadevall Touseil	Concòrdia
National list	Judith Salazar Alvarez	Social Democratic Party
National list	Susagna Vela Palomares	Social Democratic Party
National list	Pere Baró Rocamonde	Social Democratic Party
National list	Carine Montaner Raynaud	Andorra Endavant
National list	Noemi Amador Perez	Andorra Endavant
National list	Marcos Monteagudo Torres	Andorra Endavant
Andorra la Vella	Conxita Marsol Riart	Democrats for Andorra
Andorra la Vella	Alain Cabanes Galian	Democrats for Andorra
Canillo	Guillem Casal Font	Democrats for Andorra
Canillo	Jordi Jordana Rossell	Democrats for Andorra
Encamp	Jordi Torres Falcó	Democrats for Andorra
Encamp	Maria Martisella Gonzalez	Democrats for Andorra
Escaldes-Engordany	Trinitat Marin Gonzalez	Democrats for Andorra
Escaldes-Engordany	Marc Magallón Font	Action for Andorra
La Massana	Carles Naudi d'Areny-Plandolit Balsells	Committed Citizens
La Massana	David Montane Amador	Committed Citizens
Ordino	Bernadeta Coma González	Democrats for Andorra
Ordino	Alexandra Codina Tort	Democrats for Andorra
Sant Julià de Lòria	Pol Bartolome Areny	Concòrdia
Sant Julià de Lòria	Maria Angela Ache Feliu	Concòrdia
Source: eleccions.ad
