= 8th General Council =

General Council between 2019 and 2023

←	7th	9th	→

Overview
- Legislative body: General Council
- Meeting place: New Parliament of Andorra, Carrer de la Vall, 11, AD500 Andorra la Vella
- Term: 2 May 2019 – 6 February 2023
- Election: 2 April 2019
- Website: consellgeneral.ad

Councillors
- Members: 28
- General Syndic: Roser Suñé Pascuet (DA)
- Deputy General Syndic: Meritxell Palmitjavila Naudí (DA)
- Secretary of the Syndic: Silvia Ferrer Ghiringhelli (L'A)
- Secretary of the Syndic: Susanna Vela Palomares (PS)

The 8th General Council was a meeting of the General Council, the unicameral parliament of Andorra, with the membership determined by the results of the parliamentary election held on 7 April 2019. The General Council met for the first time on 2 May 2019. According to the Constitution of Andorra the maximum legislative term of the congress is 4 years from the preceding election.

== Election ==
The 2019 Andorran parliamentary election under the 1993 Constitution was held on 7 April 2019. It saw the Democrats for Andorra (DA) remaining the largest party in the General Council, but falling short of a majority.

Alliance	Votes (PR)	%	Seats	+/−
DA	6,248	35.13	11	-4
PS	5,445	30.62	7	±0
L'A	2,219	12.48	4	±0
TV–UL	1,853	10.42	4	+3
Others	2,018	11.35	0	-2
CC	(Note: CC only ran on the parish constituency of La Massana.)		2	+2
Total	19,172	100.00	28	±0

== History ==
The new Consell met for the first time on 2 May 2019, with Roser Suñé and Meritxell Palmitjavila (DA) being elected General Syndic and Deputy General Syndic of the General Council with the support of Committed Citizens and the Liberals on a single round.

Syndics
Candidates		Votes
Roser Suñé Pascuet; Meritxell Palmitjavilla Naudí	DA	17
Rosa Gili Casals; Judith Salazar Álvarez	PS	7
Blank ballots		4
Invalid ballots		0
Absentees		0
Total		28

Secretaries
Candidates		Votes
Ferran Costa Marimon	L'A	17
Susanna Vela Palomares	PS	7
Blank ballots		4
Invalid ballots		0
Absentees		0
Total		28

== Government ==
Investiture; 14 May 2023
Candidate	Votes
Xavier Espot Zamora (DA): • Democrats for Andorra (11); • Liberals of Andorra (4); • Committed Citizens (2)	16 / 28
Pere López Agràs (PS): • Social Democratic Party (7)	7 / 28
Abstentions: • Third Way–Lauredian Union (4)	4 / 28

== Parliamentary groups ==
Group	Members		Chairperson(s)	
Group	At election 7 April 2019	At dissolution	Chairperson(s)	
Democratic	11 / 28	11 / 28	Carles Enseñat Reig	2 May 2019 – present
Social-democratic	7 / 28	7 / 28	Pere López Agràs	2 May 2019 – present
Liberal (before 25 June 2022)	4 / 28	4 / 28	Ferran Costa Marimon	2 May 2019 – present
Independent (after 25 June 2022)	4 / 28	4 / 28	Ferran Costa Marimon	2 May 2019 – present
Third Way + Lauredian Union + Independents	4 / 28	3 / 28	Josep Pintat Forné	2 May 2019 – present
Committed Citizens	3 / 28	3 / 28	Carles Naudi d'Areny-Plandolit Balsells	2 May 2019 – present
Non-attached	0 / 28	1 / 28	Carine Montaner Raynaud	9 March 2021 – present

== Members ==
Electoral district	Councillor	Party
National list	Xavier Espot Zamora	Democrats for Andorra
National list	Roser Suñé Pascuet	Democrats for Andorra
National list	Nuria Rossell Jordana	Democrats for Andorra
National list	Carles Enseñat Reig	Democrats for Andorra
National list	Ester Molne Soldevila	Democrats for Andorra
National list	Pere López Agràs	Social Democratic Party
National list	Susagna Vela Palomares	Social Democratic Party
National list	Judith Salazar Alvarez	Social Democratic Party
National list	Jordi Font Mariné	Social Democratic Party
National list	Roger Padreny Carmona	Social Democratic Party
National list	Jordi Gallardo Fernàndez	~~Liberals of Andorra~~
National list	Jordi Gallardo Fernàndez	Action for Andorra (Note: Liberal until 25 June 2022.)
National list	Ferran Joaquim Costa Marimon	~~Liberals of Andorra~~
National list	Ferran Joaquim Costa Marimon	Action for Andorra
National list	Josep Pintat Forné	Third Way
National list	Joan Carles Camp Areny	Third Way
Andorra la Vella	Joaquim Miro Castillo	Social Democratic Party
Andorra la Vella	Silvia Ferrer Ghiringhelli	~~Liberals of Andorra~~
Andorra la Vella	Silvia Ferrer Ghiringhelli	Action for Andorra
Canillo	Meritxell Palmitjavila Naudí	Democrats for Andorra
Canillo	Mònica Bonell Tuset	Democrats for Andorra
Encamp	Jordi Torres Falcó	Democrats for Andorra
Encamp	Maria Martisella Gonzalez	Democrats for Andorra
Escaldes-Engordany	~~Rosa Gili Casals~~ (Note: Member until 7 November 2019.)	~~Social Democratic Party~~
Escaldes-Engordany	Marc Magallón Font	~~Liberals of Andorra~~
Escaldes-Engordany	Marc Magallón Font	Action for Andorra
Escaldes-Engordany	Carles Sánchez Rodríguez (Note: Member since 7 November 2019.)	Social Democratic Party
La Massana	Carles Naudi d'Areny-Plandolit Balsells	Committed Citizens
La Massana	Raul Ferré Bonet	Committed Citizens
Ordino	Joan Martínez Benazet	Democrats for Andorra
Ordino	Alexandra Codina Tort	Democrats for Andorra
Sant Julià de Lòria	Josep Majoral Obiols	Third Way
Sant Julià de Lòria	Carine Montaner Raynaud	~~Third Way~~
Sant Julià de Lòria	Carine Montaner Raynaud	Independent (Note: Third Way until 9 March 2021.)
Source: eleccions.ad
