= Politics of Andorra =

The politics of Andorra take place in a framework of a parliamentary constitutional diarchy, and a multi-party system. Executive power is exercised by the government, with the Head of Government of Andorra as chief executive. Legislative power is vested in both the government and parliament. The judiciary is independent of the executive and the legislature.

Before 1993, Andorra's political system had no clear division of powers into executive, legislative, and judicial branches. A constitution ratified and approved in 1993 establishes Andorra as a sovereign parliamentary democracy that retains the Bishop of Urgell and president of France as co-princes and heads of state. However, the head of government retains executive power. The two co-princes serve coequally with limited powers that do not include an individual veto over government acts (however, a bill can in effect be "vetoed" if both do not sign the legislation). They are each represented in Andorra by a personal representative.

The fundamental impetus for this political transformation was a recommendation by the Council of Europe in 1990 that, if Andorra wished to attain full integration in the European Union (EU), it should adopt a modern constitution that guarantees the rights of those living and working there. A Tripartite Commission – made up of representatives of the co-princes, the General Council, and the Executive Council – was formed in 1990 and finalized the draft constitution in April 1991, making the new constitution a fact.

One remaining, symbolic, legacy of Andorra's special relationship with France and Spain, is that the principality has no postal service of its own – French and Spanish postal services operate side by side, although each of them issues separate stamps for Andorra, instead of using their own.

== Government ==
=== Executive branch ===
Under the 1993 constitution, the co-princes continue as heads of state, but the head of government retains executive power. The two co-princes serve coequally with limited powers that do not include veto over government acts. Both are represented in Andorra by a delegate, although since 1993, France and Spain have their own embassies. As co-princes of Andorra, the Bishop of Urgell and the President of France maintain supreme authority in approval of all international treaties with France and Spain, as well as all those that deal with internal security, defense, Andorran territory, diplomatic representation, and judicial or penal cooperation. Although the institution of the co-princes is viewed by some as an anachronism, the majority sees them as both a link with Andorra's traditions and a way to balance the power of Andorra's two much larger neighbors.

The way the two princes are chosen makes Andorra one of the most politically distinct nations on earth. One co-prince is the sitting Bishop of Urgell of the Catalan city of La Seu d'Urgell, currently Josep-Lluís Serrano Pentinat. The other is the sitting President of France, currently Emmanuel Macron (it has historically been any head of state of France, including kings and emperors of the French). As neither prince lives in Andorra, their role is almost entirely ceremonial.

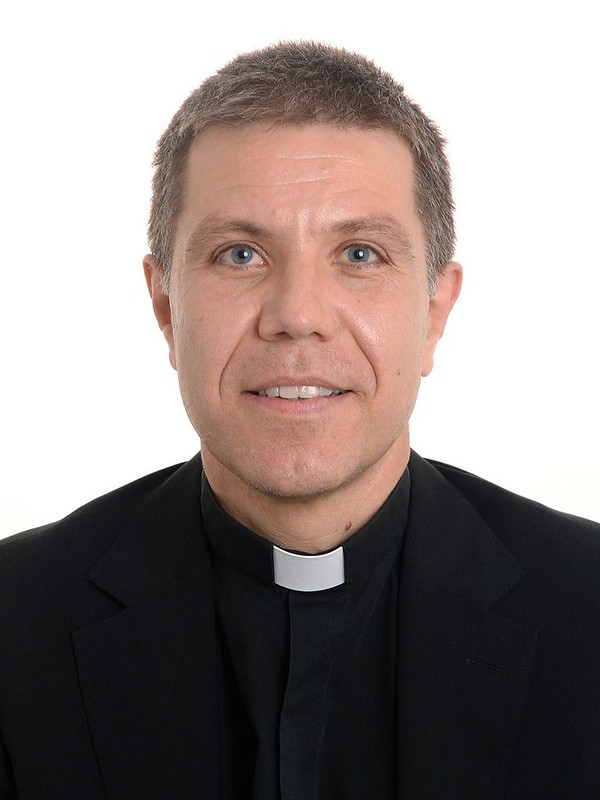
Josep-Lluís Serrano Pentinat
current episcopal co-prince of Andorra since 31 May 2025.

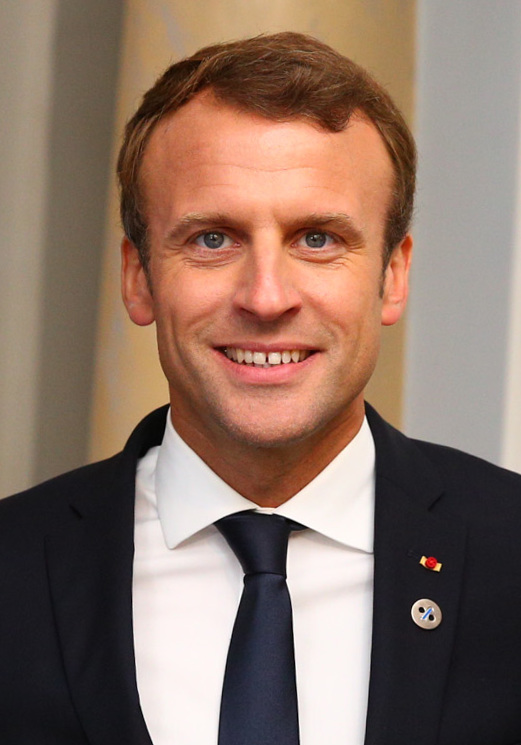
Emmanuel Macron
current French co-prince of Andorra since 14 May 2017.

In 1981, the Executive Council, consisting of the Cap de Govern (head of government) and seven ministers, was established. Every four years, after the general elections, the General Council elects the head of government, who, in turn, chooses the other members of the Executive Council.

Main office-holders
| Office | Name | Party | Since |
|---|---|---|---|
| Co-Princes | Josep-Lluís Serrano Pentinat | | 31 May 2025 |
| Co-Princes | Emmanuel Macron | En Marche! | 14 May 2017 |
| Representatives | Eduard Ibáñez Pulido | | 27 November 2023 |
| Representatives | Patrice Faure | | 20 November 2024 |
| Prime Minister | Xavier Espot Zamora | Democrats for Andorra | 16 May 2019 |

=== Legislative branch ===
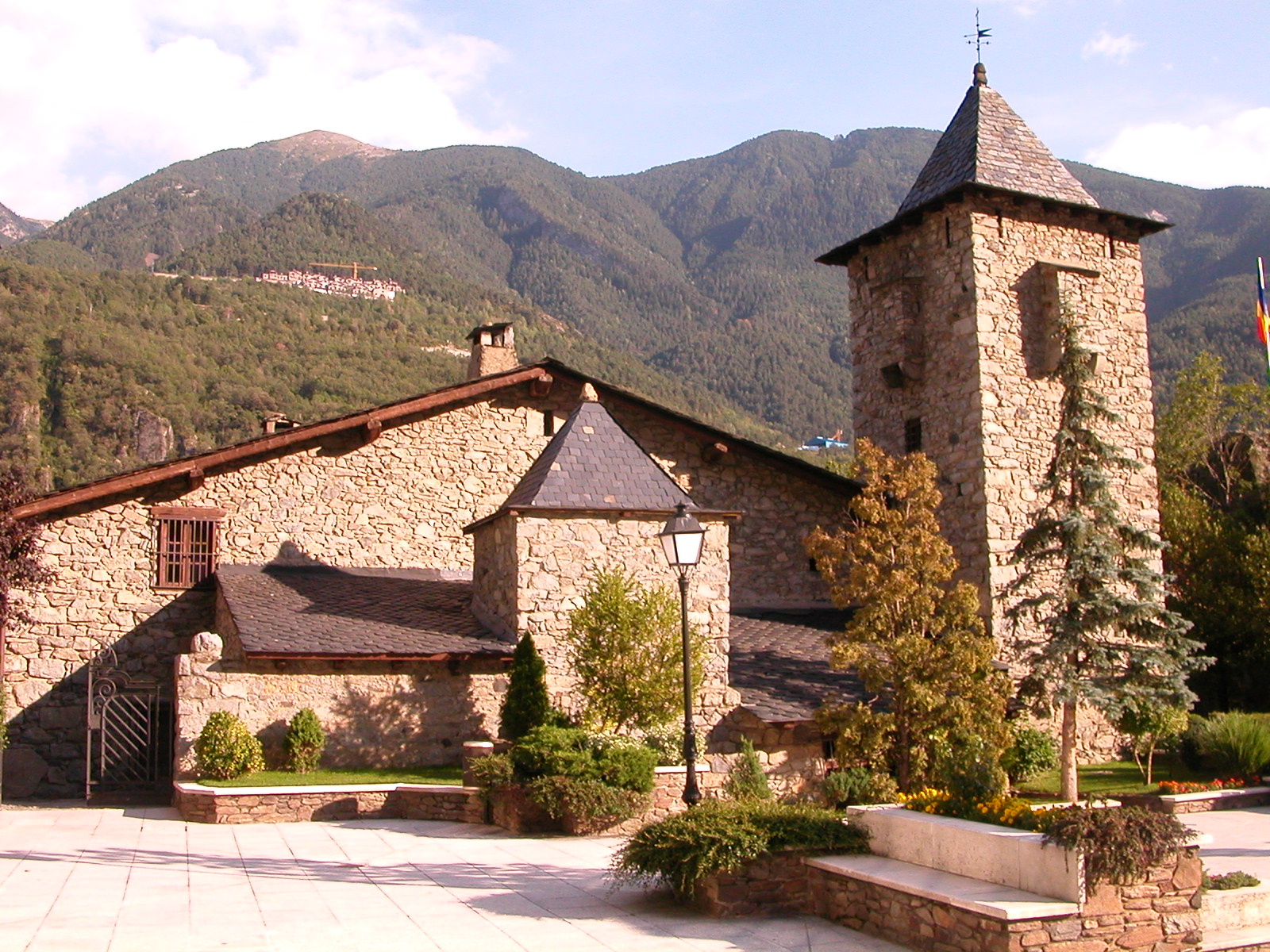
Casa de la Vall, historical parliament of Andorra

Andorra's main legislative body is the 28-member General Council (Parliament).The sindic (president), the subsindic and the members of the Council are elected in the general elections to be held every four years. The Council meets throughout the year on dates set by tradition or as required.

At least one representative from each parish must be present for the General Council to meet. Historically, within the General Council, four deputies apiece from each of the seven parishes have provided representation. This system allowed parishes with as few as 350 voters the same number of representatives as larger parishes with up to 2,600 voters. To reduce this imbalance, a provision in the new constitution modified the structure and format for electing Council members. Under the new format, half of the representatives are chosen by the traditional system, and the other half selected from nationwide lists.

A sindic and a subsindic are chosen by the General Council to implement its decisions. They serve three-year terms and may be reappointed once. They receive an annual salary. Sindics have virtually no discretionary powers, and all policy decisions must be approved by the Council as a whole.

=== Judicial branch ===
The judicial system is independent. Courts apply the customary law of Andorra, supplemented with Roman law and customary Catalan law. Civil cases are first heard by the Court of Batlles – a group of four judges, two chosen by each co-prince. Appeals are heard in the Court of Appeals. The highest body is the five-member Superior Court of Justice.

== Political parties and elections ==
The last election for the General Council was held on 2 April 2023.

=== April 2023 Andorran General Council election results ===
Graph of the party split among 28 seats.
| Party or alliance | | PR | | | Constituency | | | Total seats | +/– |
| Party or alliance | | Votes | % | Seats | Votes | % | Seats | Total seats | +/– |
|---|---|---|---|---|---|---|---|---|---|
| Government alliance | Democrats for Andorra | 6,262 | 32.66 | 4 | 7,835 | 43.63 | 10 | 14 | +3 |
| Government alliance | Committed Citizens | 6,262 | 32.66 | 1 | 7,835 | 43.63 | 1 | 2 | – |
| Government alliance | Liberals of Andorra | 893 | 4.66 | 0 | 7,835 | 43.63 | 0 | 0 | –4 |
| Government alliance | Action for Andorra | 805 | 4.20 | 0 | 7,835 | 43.63 | 1 | 1 | New |
| Concord | | 4,109 | 21.43 | 3 | 3,516 | 19.58 | 2 | 5 | New |
| Center-left alliance | Social Democratic Party | 4,036 | 21.05 | 3 | 5,238 | 29.17 | 0 | 3 | –4 |
| Center-left alliance | Social Democracy and Progress | 4,036 | 21.05 | 0 | 5,238 | 29.17 | 0 | 0 | – |
| Andorra Forward | | 3,067 | 16.00 | 3 | 1,370 | 7.63 | 0 | 3 | New |
| Total | | 19,172 | 100.00 | 14 | 17,959 | 100.00 | 14 | 28 | 0 |
| Valid votes | | 19,172 | 95.62 | | 17,959 | 89.60 | | | |
| Invalid votes | | 341 | 1.70 | | 557 | 2.78 | | | |
| Blank votes | | 537 | 2.68 | | 1,527 | 7.62 | | | |
| Total votes | | 20,050 | 100.00 | | 20,043 | 100.00 | | | |
| Registered voters/turnout | | 29,958 | 66.93 | | 29,958 | 66.90 | | | |
Source: Eleccions.ad, Lists

== Administrative divisions ==
Andorra is formed by seven parishes (parròquies, singular - parròquia); Andorra la Vella, Canillo, Encamp, La Massana, Escaldes-Engordany, Ordino, Sant Julia de Loria.

== Security ==
The Government of Andorra maintains a small ceremonial Army, a well-equipped modernized Police Corps, a Fire Brigade, a Mountain Rescue Service, and the GIPA, which is a para-military unit trained in hostage and counter-terrorism roles.

Andorra has no standing army; its defense is the responsibility of France and Spain.

== Political conditions ==
Andorra's young democracy is in the process of redefining its political party system. Three out of the five parties that dominated the political scene in past years have dissolved. The Liberal Union (UL) tried to reshape itself and change its name to that of the Liberal Party of Andorra (PLA) to offer a political umbrella to small parties and groups that have not yet found their place. Another party, the Social Democratic Party of Andorra, has been formed. It was designed to attract parties previously aligned with socialist ideals. Since the 1993 constitutional ratification, three coalition governments have formed. For instance, one government united the UL, the CNA (National Andorran Coalition), and another relatively small party with Marc Forné Molné, a Liberal Unionist, as Cap de Govern, or head of government. In the 2011 election, however, the Democrats for Andorra won a landslide victory over the Social Democrats, capturing 20 of the legislature's 28 seats, with the Social Democrats winning six and the Lauredian Union winning two.

In recent years the government has instituted many reforms. It legalized political parties and trade unions, and legally guaranteed freedom of religion and assembly. There has also been a redefinition of the qualifications for Andorran citizenship, a major issue in a country where only 13,000 of 65,000 residents were legal citizens. In 1995, a law to broaden citizenship was passed, but citizenship remains difficult to acquire. Only Andorran nationals are able to transmit citizenship automatically to their children, a legal principal known as jus sanguinis. Lawful residents in Andorra who are nationals of France, Spain or Portugal may obtain citizenship after 10 years of residency. Other nationals may obtain citizenship after 20 years of residency. Children of residents may opt for Andorran citizenship after age 18 if they resided most of their lives in Andorra. Mere birth on Andorran soil, a legal principal known as jus soli, does not confer citizenship. Dual nationality is not permitted. Non-citizens are allowed to own only a 33% share of a company. Only after residing in the country for 20 years may they own 100% of a company. A proposed law to reduce the necessary years from 20 to 10 was debated in Parliament.

By creating a modern legal framework for the country, the 1993 constitution has allowed Andorra to begin a shift from an economy based largely on duty-free shopping to one based on international banking and finance. Despite promising new changes, it is likely that Andorra will, at least for the short term, continue to confront a number of difficult issues arising from the large influx of foreign residents and the need to develop modern social and political institutions. In addition to questions of Andorran nationality and immigration policy, other priority issues include allowing freedom of association, dealing with housing scarcities and speculation in real estate, developing the tourism industry, and renegotiating the relationship with the European Union.
