= Pere Baró =

Andorran politician

Pere Baró Rocamonde (born 2 August 1991) is an Andorran politician. He was elected to the General Council in 2023, then became leader of the Social Democratic Party (PS).

== Biography ==
Born in Andorra la Vella, Baró joined the Social Democratic Party (PS) in February 2015 and became leader of its youth wing the following year. When leader Pere López resigned after a poor performance in the 2023 Andorran parliamentary election, with three members elected, fourth-placed Baró took his seat in the General Council in April. In May, he was named president of the party. Since, his public political rating in national polls has been of 5.3 (2024) and 5.2 (2025) out of 10, placing him third behind the Prime Minister, Xavier Espot Zamora (Democrats for Andorra, 5.6), and the Leader of the Opposition, Cerni Escalé Cabré (Concord, 6.4).

Baró supports the Association Agreement between Andorra and the European Union.
