= Law of Andorra =

The law of Andorra includes customary law and legislation.

== Constitution ==
The Constitution of Andorra was the subject of a referendum on 14 March 1993.

== Legislation ==
The legislature is the Consell General (English: "General Council"). The gazette is called Butlletí Oficial del Principat d'Andorra (English: "Official Bulletin of the Principality of Andorra"). Legislation includes decrees.

=== List of legislation ===
- Decree concerning Andorran nationality of 17 June 1939
- Decree of 23 August 1947
- Decree concerning Andorran nationality of 7 April 1970
- Decree concerning the political rights of Andorran women of 14 April 1970
- Decree on legal and political majority of 2 July 1971
- Decree concerning the eligibility of Andorran women of 5 September 1973
- Decree on the process of institutional reform of 15 January 1981
- Decree on arms of 3 July 1989
- Penal Code of 11 July 1990
- Penal Code of 21 February 2005

== Customary law ==
Historical or material sources of customary law include canon law,, Catalan law,, French law and Roman law. Literary sources of customary law include the books Manual Digest (1748) and the Politar Andorrà (1763).

== Courts and judiciary ==
Courts include the Consell Superior de la Justica, the Tribunal Constitucional, the Tribunal Superior de la Justicia, the Tribunal de Corts, the Tribunal de Batlles, and multiple Batllia.

== Legal practitioners ==
Andorra has advocates (Catalan: advocat) and notaries. There is a College of Advocates (Catalan: Col·legi d'Advocats).

== Criminal law ==
The Tribunal de Corts is the court which has jurisdiction over crime. The Penal Code of 11 July 1990 was the country's first. There is now a new Penal Code of 21 February 2005 Capital punishment was proscribed in 1990. There is a Police Corps of Andorra.

== Nationality ==
Legislation on this subject has included the Decree concerning Andorran nationality of 17 June 1939 and the Decree concerning Andorran nationality of 7 April 1970.

== Heritage ==
Law 9 of 12 July 2003 relates to Patrimoni Cultural and Bé d'interès cultural.
