= Sandra Codina =

Andorran politician (born 1968)

The Most Excellent Sandra Codina MP

Deputy General Syndic of the General Council of Andorra
- Incumbent
- Assumed office 26 April 2023
- Monarchs: Episcopal Co-prince: Joan Enric Vives Sicília (until 2025); Josep-Lluís Serrano Pentinat (since 2025); French Co-prince: Emmanuel Macron
- President: Carles Ensenyat Reig (General Syndic)
- Representative: Episcopal: Josep Maria Mauri; French: Patrick Strzoda
- Preceded by: Meritxell Palmitjavila Naudí

Personal details
- Born: 30 July 1968 (age 57)
- Party: Democrats for Andorra

Sandra Codina Tort (born 30 July 1968) is an Andorran politician, Deputy General Syndic of the General Council of Andorra since 2023.

== Career ==
Codina was born on 30 July 1968. She has a diploma in geography and history.

She is member of Democrats for Andorra (DA) party, serving as its first vicepresident. Codina was first elected member of the General Council in the 2019 parliamentary election for Ordino, and was sworn in on 2 May 2019. During that term, Codina served as member of the Health Committee; of the Education, Research, Culture, Youth and Sports Committee, and of the Social Affairs and Equality Committee. She was also member of the Andorran delegation to the Parliamentary Assembly of the Organization for Security and Co-operation in Europe.

In the 2023 parliamentary election, Codina was re-elected as candidate for Ordino. On 26 April 2023, Codina was elected Deputy General Syndic of the General Council. Democrats for Andorra agreed to cede her seat to the Committed Citizens, so that they could form their parliamentary group, which requires at least three councillors.
