= List of current legislatures =

This is a list of current legislatures.

== List of national legislatures ==
Country	Session	Members	Last election	Source
Abkhazia	7th People's Assembly of Abkhazia	People's Assembly of Abkhazia, Current membership	12 March 2022	
Afghanistan		Leadership Council of Afghanistan, Current membership	No Elections	
Albania	31st Legislature of Albania		25 April 2021	
Algeria			5 February 2022; 12 June 2021	
Andorra	9th General Council	9th General Council, Members	2 April 2023	
Angola	5th National Assembly of Angola		24 August 2022	
Antigua and Barbuda	16th Parliament of Antigua and Barbuda		18 January 2023	
Argentina		List of Argentine senators, 2023–2025; List of Argentine deputies, 2023–2025	9 December 2023	
Armenia	8th National Assembly of Armenia		1 August 2021	
Australia	48th Parliament of Australia	Members of the Australian House of Representatives, 2025–2028; Members of the Australian Senate, 2025–2028	3 May 2025	
Austria		List of members of the 28th National Council of Austria	29 September 2024	
Azerbaijan	6th National Assembly of Azerbaijan		9 February 2020	
(The Bahamas) Bahamas	15th Bahamian Parliament		12 May 2026	
Bahrain			12–19 November 2022	
Bangladesh	12th Jatiya Sangsad	List of members of the 12th Jatiya Sangsad	7 January 2024	
Barbados		House of Assembly, List of members of the Senate of Barbados	11 February 2026	
Belarus		7th Council of the Republic of Belarus and 7th House of Representatives of Belarus	17 November 2019	
Belgium		List of members of the Chamber of Representatives of Belgium, 2024–2029; List of members of the Senate of Belgium, 2024–	9 June 2024	
Belize		House of Representatives, Senate	12 March 2025	
Benin	9th National Assembly of Benin		8 January 2023	
Bhutan	9th Session of the First Parliament of Bhutan		2023–24 Bhutanese National Assembly election	
Bolivia	3rd Plurinational Legislative Assembly of Bolivia		3 November 2020	
Bosnia and Herzegovina		House of Peoples, House of Representatives	2 October 2022	
Botswana	13th Parliament of Botswana		30 October 2024	
Brazil	57th Legislature of the National Congress	List of Brazilian senators (2023–2027); List of Brazilian deputies (2023–2027)	2 October 2022	
Brunei		Legislative Council of Brunei, Membership	No Elections	
Bulgaria	49th National Assembly of Bulgaria		2 April 2023	
Burkina Faso	7th National Assembly of Burkina Faso		22 November 2020	
Burundi			20 July 2020	
Cape Verde			18 April 2021	
Cambodia	7th National Assembly of Cambodia	Senate (Cambodia), List of senators in 2018	25 February 2018	
Cameroon		Senate (Cameroon), Current members of the Senate	12 March 2023 (Senate) 9 February 2020 (NA)	
Canada	45th Canadian Parliament	List of House members of the 45th Parliament of Canada; List of current senators of Canada	28 April 2025	
Central African Republic			27 December 2020	
Chad			13 February 2011	
Chile	57th National Congress of Chile		11 March 2026	
China	14th National People's Congress	List of members of the 14th National People's Congress	11 March 2023	
Colombia	9th Congress of Colombia	List of current members of the Senate of Colombia	20 July 2022	
Comoros			12 and 30 January 2025	
(Republic of the Congo) Congo			10 and 31 July 2022 20 August 2023	
Costa Rica		List of deputies of Costa Rica, 2022-2026	6 February 2022	
(Ivory Coast) Côte d'Ivoire			16 September 2023 6 March 2021	
Croatia		List of members of Croatian Parliament, 2024–	17 April 2024	
Cuba			26 March 2023	
Cyprus		List of members of the parliament of Cyprus, 2021–2026	30 May 2021	
Czech Republic		List of MPs elected in the 2025 Czech parliamentary election	3 and 4 October 2025	
Democratic Republic of the Congo			20 December 2023	
Denmark		List of members of the Folketing, 2026–present	24 March 2026	
Djibouti			24 February 2023	
Dominica			6 December 2022	
Dominican Republic			19 May 2024	
(Timor-Leste) East Timor	6th National Parliament of East Timor		21 May 2023	
Ecuador		Members of the National Assembly of Ecuador (2025–present)	13 April 2025	
Egypt			24–25 October and 7–8 November 2020 (Parliament) 11-12 August 2020 (Senate)	
El Salvador		List of members of the XIII Legislative Assembly of El Salvador	1 May 2021	
Equatorial Guinea			20 November 2022	
Eritrea			Elections never held	
Estonia	XV Riigikogu	Members of the 15th Riigikogu	5 March 2023	
Eswatini			29 September 2023	
Ethiopia			21 June 2021 and 30 September 2021	
Fiji			14 December 2022	
Finland		List of members of the Parliament of Finland, 2023–2027	2 April 2023	
France	17th legislature of the French Fifth Republic	List of deputies of the 17th National Assembly of France	30 June 2024 and 7 July 2024	
French Polynesia		List of members of the Assembly of French Polynesia (2023–2028)	30 April 2023	
Gabon		List of members of the National Assembly of Gabon	26 August 2023 (coup d'état annuls results 4 days later)	
(The Gambia) Gambia		List of NAMs elected in the Gambian parliamentary election, 2022	2022 Gambian parliamentary election	
(Georgia (country)) Georgia	10th Parliament of Georgia		11 December 2020	
Germany		List of members of the 21st Bundestag	23 February 2025	
Ghana		List of MPs elected in the 2020 Ghanaian general election	7 January 2021	
Greece		List of members of the Hellenic Parliament, June 2023	25 June 2023	
Grenada			23 June 2022	
Guatemala			25 June 2023	
Guinea			Not elected (coup d'état)	
Guinea-Bissau			Dissolved	
Guyana	12th Parliament of the Co-operative Republic of Guyana		2 March 2020	
Haiti		List of current members of the Parliament of Haiti	2015–16	
Honduras			28 November 2021	
Hungary		List of members of the National Assembly of Hungary (2026–2030)	2026 Hungarian parliamentary election	
Iceland		List of members of the parliament of Iceland	25 September 2021	
India	18th Lok Sabha	List of members of the 18th Lok Sabha	19 April – 1 June 2024	
Indonesia		List of current senators of the Regional Representative Council	14 February 2024	
Iran		List of Iran's parliament representatives (11th term)	21 February 2020	
Iraq			10 October 2021	
(Republic of Ireland) Ireland		34th Dáil	29 November 2024	
Israel		List of members of the twenty-fifth Knesset	15 November 2022	
Italy	Legislature XIX of Italy	List of members of the Italian Chamber of Deputies, 2022–; List of members of the Italian Senate, 2022–	13 October 2022	
Jamaica	15th Parliament of Jamaica		3 September 2025	
Japan		List of members of the Diet of Japan	10 July 2022; 27 October 2024	
Jordan	18th Parliament of Jordan		7 November 2016	
Kazakhstan	8th Parliament of Kazakhstan	List of Mäjilis members of the 8th Parliament of Kazakhstan	19 March 2023	
Kenya	13th Parliament of Kenya		9 August 2022	
Kiribati			14 and 19 August 2024	
Kosovo			9 February 2025	
Kuwait			4 April 2024 (Later suspended)	
Kyrgyzstan	7th Supreme Council of Kyrgyzstan		29 December 2021	
Laos			21 February 2021	
Latvia	Fourteenth Saeima of Latvia		1 November 2022	
Lebanon		List of members of the 2022–2026 Lebanese Parliament	15 May 2022	
Lesotho			7 October 2022	
Liberia		House of Representatives of Liberia, Current representatives	10 October 2023	
Libya			25 June 2014	
Liechtenstein			9 February 2025	
Lithuania	Thirteenth Seimas of Lithuania		13 November 2020	
Luxembourg	35th Chamber of Deputies of Luxembourg	35th Chamber of Deputies of Luxembourg#Member list	8 October 2023	
Madagascar			29 May 2024	
Malawi			21 May 2019	
Malaysia	15th Malaysian Parliament	Members of the Dewan Negara, 15th Malaysian Parliament; Members of the Dewan Rakyat, 15th Malaysian Parliament	19 November 2022	
Maldives			21 April 2024	
Mali			29 March 2020	
Malta		List of members of the parliament of Malta, 2026–2031	30 May 2026	
Marshall Islands			20 November 2023	
Mauritania	10th National Assembly of Mauritania		19 June 2023	
Mauritius	8th National Assembly of Mauritius		10 November 2024	
Mexico	LXVI Legislature of the Mexican Congress		2 June 2024	
(Federated States of Micronesia) Micronesia			7 March 2023	
Monaco			5 February 2023	
Moldova			28 September 2025	
Mongolia		List of members of the State Great Khural, 2024–2028	2 July 2024	
Montenegro	Parliament of Montenegro, 2020–2024	List of members of the 11th assembly of the Parliament of Montenegro, 2020–present	23 September 2020	
Morocco			8 September 2021	
Mozambique			9 October 2024	
Myanmar		State Administration Council#Current members	Not elected (coup d'état)	
Namibia		List of members of the 7th National Assembly of Namibia	27 November 2019	
Nauru	25th Parliament of Nauru		11 October 2025	
Nepal	2nd Federal Parliament of Nepal		9 January 2023	
(Kingdom of the Netherlands) Netherlands		List of members of the Senate of the Netherlands, 2023–2027; List of members of the House of Representatives of the Netherlands, 2023–2025	30 May 2023; 22 November 2023	
New Zealand	54th New Zealand Parliament		14 October 2023	
Nicaragua			7 November 2021	
Niger			Not elected (coup d'état)	
Nigeria	10th Nigeria National Assembly	List of members of the House of Representatives of Nigeria, 2023–2027	13 June 2023	
Niue	18th Niue Assembly		29 April 2023	
North Korea	14th Supreme People's Assembly		10 March 2019	
North Macedonia		List of members of the Assembly of North Macedonia, 2020–2024	15 July 2020	
Norway		List of members of the Storting, 2025–2029	8 September 2025	
Oman			29 October 2023	
Pakistan	15th National Assembly of Pakistan	List of members of the 15th National Assembly of Pakistan	25 July 2018	
Palau			5 November 2024	
Palestine				
Panama			5 May 2024	
Papua New Guinea		Members of the National Parliament of Papua New Guinea, 2022–2027	22 July 2022	
Paraguay			30 April 2023	
Peru			11 April 2021	
Philippines	20th Congress of the Philippines		May 9, 2022	
Poland	10th term Sejm and 11th term Senate of Poland	List of Sejm members (2023–2027); List of Polish senators (2023–2027)	15 October 2023	
Portugal	16th Legislature of the Third Portuguese Republic	List of members of the 16th Assembly of the Republic (Portugal)	10 March 2024	
Qatar			2 October 2021	
Romania		List of members of the Chamber of Deputies of Romania (2020–2024)	6 December 2020	
Russia	9th State Duma	List of members of the Federation Council; List of members of the 9th Russian State Duma	20 September 2026 (State Duma)	
Rwanda			15 July 2024	
Sahrawi Arab Democratic Republic		List of members of the Sahrawi National Council, 2023–2026	8–9 April 2023	
Saint Kitts and Nevis			5 August 2022	
Saint Lucia			26 July 2021	
Saint Vincent and the Grenadines			5 November 2020	
Samoa		List of members of the Legislative Assembly of Samoa (2021–2026)	9 April 2021	
San Marino			9 June 2024	
São Tomé and Príncipe			25 September 2022	
Saudi Arabia			All appointed, not elected	
Senegal			17 November 2024	
Serbia	13th National Assembly of Serbia		1 August 2022	
Seychelles			22–24 October 2020	
Sierra Leone		List of Sierra Leone members of Parliament	24 June 2023	
Singapore	15th Parliament of Singapore	List of Singaporean members of Parliament	3 May 2025	
Slovakia		List of members of the National Council of Slovakia, 2023–2027	30 September 2023	
Slovenia	9th National Assembly of Slovenia		24 April 2022	
Solomon Islands	11th Parliament of Solomon Islands		3 April 2019	
Somalia		List of members of the Federal Parliament of Somalia	1 November 2021-31 March 2022	
South Africa	28th South African Parliament	List of National Assembly members of the 28th Parliament of South Africa; List of National Council of Provinces members of the 28th Parliament of South Africa	29 May 2024	
South Korea		List of members of the National Assembly (South Korea), 2024–2028	10 April 2024	
South Sudan			11–15 April 2010 (Members elected continue serving after independence)	
Spain	15th Cortes Generales	15th Congress of Deputies and 15th Senate of Spain	23 July 2023	
Sri Lanka	17th Parliament of Sri Lanka	17th Parliament of Sri Lanka#List	14 November 2024	
Sudan	No legislature; see Sudanese civil war (2023–present)			
Suriname	8th Surinamese National Assembly	List of members of the National Assembly (Suriname), 2020–2025	25 May 2020	
Sweden		List of members of the Riksdag, 2022–2026	11 September 2022	
Switzerland		List of members of the National Council of Switzerland (2023–2027); List of members of the Swiss Council of States (2023–2027)	2023 Swiss federal election	
Syria	22nd People's Assembly	List of members of the People's Assembly, 2026–present	5 October 2025–24 May 2026	
Taiwan	11th Legislative Yuan		13 January 2024	
Tajikistan			1 March 2020	
Tanzania	12th Parliament of Tanzania		28 October 2020	
Thailand	2023 Thai House of Representatives	2023 Thai House of Representatives#House of Representatives composition	14 May 2023 9–26 June 2024	
Togo			29 April 2024	
Tonga			18 November 2021	
Trinidad and Tobago	13th Republican Parliament of Trinidad and Tobago		28 April 2025	
Tunisia			17 December 2022-29 January 2023	
Turkey	28th Parliament of Turkey	28th Parliament of Turkey, Members	2 June 2023	
Turkmenistan			26 March 2023	
Tuvalu		List of Tuvalu MPs	2024 Tuvaluan general election	
Uganda	Parliament of Uganda	List of members of the eleventh Parliament of Uganda	14 January 2021	
Ukraine	9th Ukrainian Verkhovna Rada	List of members of the parliament of Ukraine, 2019–2023	29 August 2019	
United Arab Emirates	Federal National Council	2023 Emirati parliamentary election, Elected members	7 October 2023	
United Kingdom	59th Parliament of the United Kingdom	List of MPs elected in the 2024 United Kingdom general election; List of current members of the House of Lords	4 July 2024	
United States of America	119th United States Congress	List of current United States representatives; List of current United States senators	5 November 2024	
Uruguay	49th Legislature of the Chamber of Deputies of Uruguay; 49th Legislature of the Chamber of Senators of Uruguay	49th Legislature of the Chamber of Deputies of Uruguay, Members; 49th Legislature of the Chamber of Senators of Uruguay, Members	27 October 2019	
Uzbekistan	5th Oliy Majlis		22 December 2019 and 5 January 2020	
Vanuatu	13th Parliament of Vanuatu	List of members of the Parliament of Vanuatu (2020–2022)	13 October 2022	
Venezuela	V National Assembly of Venezuela		6 December 2020	
Vietnam	15th National Assembly of Vietnam		23 May 2021	
Yemen			27 April 2003	
Zambia	11th Parliament of Zambia	List of members of the National Assembly of Zambia (2021–2026)	12 August 2021	
Zimbabwe	10th Parliament of Zimbabwe	List of members of the 10th Parliament of Zimbabwe	23 August 2023	

== List of subnational legislatures ==
=== Australia ===
State/Territory	Session	Members	Last Election	Source
New South Wales		Members of the New South Wales Legislative Assembly, 2023–2027	2023 New South Wales state election	
Victoria		Members of the Victorian Legislative Assembly, 2022–2026	2022 Victorian state election	
Queensland	58th Parliament of Queensland		2024 Queensland state election	
Western Australia		Members of the Western Australian Legislative Assembly, 2021–2025	2021 Western Australian state election	
South Australia		Members of the South Australian House of Assembly, 2022–2026	2022 South Australian state election	
Tasmania		Members of the Tasmanian House of Assembly, 2024–2028	2024 Tasmanian state election	
Australian Capital Territory		Members of the Australian Capital Territory Legislative Assembly, 2024–2028	2024 Australian Capital Territory election	
Northern Territory		Members of the Northern Territory Legislative Assembly, 2024–2028	2024 Northern Territory general election	
Christmas Island				
Cocos Islands				
Norfolk Island				

=== Canada ===
Province/Territory	Session	Members	Last election	Source
Alberta	31st Alberta Legislature	Current members of Legislative Assembly of Alberta	2023 Alberta general election	
British Columbia	42nd Parliament of British Columbia	42nd Parliament of British Columbia, Members	2024 British Columbia general election	
Manitoba	43rd Manitoba Legislature	Members of the 43rd Legislative Assembly	2023 Manitoba general election	
New Brunswick	60th New Brunswick Legislature	Members of the 60th New Brunswick Legislature	2020 New Brunswick general election	
Newfoundland and Labrador	50th General Assembly of Newfoundland and Labrador	Members of the 50th General Assembly of Newfoundland and Labrador	2021 Newfoundland and Labrador general election	
Northwest Territories	17th Northwest Territories Legislative Assembly	Members of the 17th Northwest Territories Legislative Assembly	2019 Northwest Territories general election	
Nova Scotia	64th General Assembly of Nova Scotia	Members of the 64th General Assembly of Nova Scotia	2021 Nova Scotia general election	
Nunavut	6th Nunavut Legislature	Members of the 6th Nunavut Legislature	2021 Nunavut general election	
Ontario	43rd Parliament of Ontario	Members of the 43rd Parliament of Ontario#	2022 Ontario general election	
Prince Edward Island	67th General Assembly of Prince Edward Island	Members of the 67th General Assembly of Prince Edward Island	2023 Prince Edward Island general election	
Quebec	43rd Quebec Legislature	Members of the 43rd Quebec Legislature	2022 Quebec general election	
Saskatchewan	29th Saskatchewan Legislature	Members of the 29th Saskatchewan Legislature	2020 Saskatchewan general election	
Yukon	35th Legislature of Yukon	Members of the 35th Legislature of Yukon	2021 Yukon general election	

=== Germany ===
State	Session	Members	Last election	Source
Baden-Württemberg	17th Landtag of Baden-Württemberg		2021 Baden-Württemberg state election	
Bavaria	19th Bavarian State Parliament		2023 Bavarian state election	
Berlin	19th Abgeordnetenhaus of Berlin	List of members of the 19th Abgeordnetenhaus of Berlin (2023–2026)	2023 Berlin state election	
Brandenburg	8th Landtag of Brandenburg	List of members of the 8th Landtag of Brandenburg	2024 Brandenburg state election	
Bremen	21st Bürgerschaft of Bremen		2023 Bremen state election	
Hamburg			2020 Hamburg state election	
Hesse	21st Landtag of Hesse		2023 Hessian state election	
Lower Saxony	19th Lower Saxony Landtag	List of members of the 19th Lower Saxony Landtag	2022 Lower Saxony state election	
Mecklenburg-Vorpommern	8th Landtag of Mecklenburg-Vorpommern		2021 Mecklenburg-Vorpommern state election	
North Rhine-Westphalia			2022 North Rhine-Westphalia state election	
Rhineland-Palatinate			2021 Rhineland-Palatinate state election	
Saarland	17th Landtag of Saarland		2022 Saarland state election	
Saxony	7th Landtag of Saxony		2024 Saxony state election	
Saxony-Anhalt	8th Landtag of Saxony-Anhalt		2021 Saxony-Anhalt state election	
Schleswig-Holstein	20th Landtag of Schleswig-Holstein		2022 Schleswig-Holstein state election	
Thuringia	8th Landtag of Thuringia		2024 Thuringian state election	

=== United Kingdom ===
Country	Session	Members	Last election	Source
Northern Ireland	7th Northern Ireland Assembly	Members of the 7th Northern Ireland Assembly	2022 Northern Ireland Assembly election	
Scotland	6th Scottish Parliament	6th Scottish Parliament, List of MSPs	2021 Scottish Parliament election	
Wales	6th Senedd	Members of the 6th Senedd	2021 Senedd election	

=== United States ===
State	Session	Members	Last election	Source
Alabama	2025 Alabama Legislature	Alabama House of Representatives, House roster; Alabama Senate, List of state senators	2024 (House); 2022 (Senate)	
Alaska	33rd Alaska State Legislature	Alaska House of Representatives, Current members; Alaska Senate, Members of the 33rd Senate	2024 (House); 2024 (Senate)	
Arizona	56th Arizona State Legislature	Arizona House of Representatives, Membership, 2023–2025; Arizona Senate, Current members, 2023–2025	2024 (House); 2024 (Senate)	
Arkansas	94th Arkansas General Assembly	Arkansas Senate, Current Senators; Arkansas House of Representatives, Current membership	2024 (House); 2024 (Senate)	
California	California State Legislature, 2025–26 session		2024 (Assembly); 2024 (Senate)	
Colorado	75th Colorado General Assembly	Colorado House of Representatives (2025-2027); Colorado Senate (2025-2027)	2024 (House); 2024 (Senate)	
Connecticut	2025 Connecticut General Assembly	Connecticut House of Representatives, List of current members; Connecticut State Senate, Members of the Senate	2024 (House); 2024 (Senate)	
Delaware	153rd Delaware General Assembly		2024 (House); 2024 (Senate)	
Florida	2025 Florida Legislature		2024 (House); 2024 (Senate)	
Georgia	157th Georgia General Assembly		2024 (House); 2024 (Senate)	
Hawaii	33rd Hawaii State Legislature		2024 (House); 2024 (Senate)	
Idaho			2024 (House); 2024 (Senate)	
Illinois	104th Illinois General Assembly		2024 (House); 2024 (Senate)	
Indiana			2024 (House); 2024 (Senate)	
Iowa	91st Iowa General Assembly		2024 (House); 2024 (Senate)	
Kansas	2025–2026 Kansas Legislature		2024 (House); 2024 (Senate)	
Kentucky	2025 Kentucky General Assembly		2024 (House); 2024 (Senate)	
Louisiana	71st Louisiana Legislature		2023 (House); 2023 (Senate)	
Maine	132nd Maine Legislature		2024 (House); 2024 (Senate)	
Maryland	446th Maryland General Assembly	List of current members of the Maryland House of Delegates; List of current members of the Maryland Senate	2022 (House); 2022 (Senate)	
Massachusetts	194th Massachusetts General Court		2024 (House); 2024 (Senate)	
Michigan	102nd Michigan Legislature		2024 (House); 2022 (Senate)	
Minnesota	94th Minnesota Legislature	Minnesota House of Representatives, Composition; Minnesota Senate, Composition	2024 (House); 2022 (Senate)	
Mississippi	2024–2028 Mississippi Legislature		2023 (House); 2023 (Senate)	
Missouri	103rd Missouri General Assembly		2024 (House); 2024 (Senate)	
Montana	69th Montana Legislature		2024 (House); 2024 (Senate)	
Nebraska	108th Nebraska Legislature	Nebraska Legislature, Membership	2024 (Unicameral)	
Nevada	83rd Nevada Legislature		2024 (House); 2024 (Senate)	
New Hampshire	2025-2026 New Hampshire General Court	Members of the New Hampshire Senate; List of members, New Hampshire House of Representatives	2024 (House); 2024 (Senate)	
New Jersey	221st New Jersey Legislature		2023 (General Assembly); 2023 (Senate)	
New Mexico	57th New Mexico Legislature		2024 (House); 2024 (Senate)	
New York	205th New York State Legislature		2024 (House); 2024 (Senate)	
North Carolina	North Carolina General Assembly of 2023–24		2024 (House); 2024 (Senate)	
North Dakota	69th Legislative Assembly of North Dakota		2024 (House); 2024 (Senate)	
Ohio	135th Ohio General Assembly		2024 (House); 2024 (Senate)	
Oklahoma	59th Oklahoma Legislature		2024 (House); 2024 (Senate)	
Oregon	82nd Oregon Legislative Assembly	Oregon House of Representatives, Current session; Oregon State Senate, 82nd Senate	2024 (House); 2024 (Senate)	
Pennsylvania	2025-2026 Pennsylvania legislature		2024 (House); 2024 (Senate)	
Rhode Island		Members of the Rhode Island Senate; Members of the Rhode Island House of Representatives	2024 (House); 2024 (Senate)	
South Carolina			2024 (House); 2024 (Senate)	
South Dakota			2024 (House); 2024 (Senate)	
Tennessee	114th Tennessee General Assembly		2024 (House); 2024 (Senate)	
Texas	88th Texas Legislature	Texas House of Representatives, List of current representatives; Texas Senate, List of members	2024 (House); 2024 (Senate)	
Utah	66th Utah State Legislature		2024 (House); 2024 (Senate)	
Vermont	2025-2026 Vermont General Assembly		2024 (House); 2024 (Senate)	
Virginia	163rd Virginia General Assembly		2023 (House of Delegates); 2023 (Senate)	
Washington	69th Washington State Legislature		2024 (House); 2024 (Senate)	
West Virginia	87th West Virginia Legislature		2024 (House); 2024 (Senate)	
Wisconsin	106th Wisconsin Legislature		2024 (House); 2024 (Senate)	
Wyoming	68th Wyoming Legislature		2024 (House); 2024 (Senate)	

=== Russia ===
Regional Parliaments of Russia
State	Session	List of members	Latest election	Source
Adygea				
Altai	7th Legislature of Altai			
Altai Krai	8th Legislative Assembly of Altai Krai		2021 Altai Krai Legislative Assembly election	
Amur				
Arkhangelsk				
Astrakhan	7th Legislature of Astrakhan			
Bashkortostan				
Bryansk Oblast				
Buryatia				
Chelyabinsk			2025 Chelyabinsk Oblast legislative election	
Chechnya				
Chukotka Autonomous Okrug				
Chuvashia				
Crimea				
Dagestan				
Ingushetia				
Irkutsk Oblast	4th Legislative Assembly of Irkustsk		2023 Irkutsk Oblast Legislative Assembly election	
Ivanovo Oblast				
Jewish Autonomous Oblast				
Kabardino-Balkaria				
Kaliningrad Oblast	7th Legislative Assembly of Kaliningrad		2021 Kaliningrad Legislature election	
Kalmykia				
Kaluga Oblast				
Kamchatka Krai				
Karelia				
Karachay-Cherkessia				
Kemerovo Oblast				
Khabarovsk Krai	8th Legislature of Khabarovsk Krai	List of Members of the 8th Khabarovsk Krai Legislature	2024 Khabarovsk Krai Legislative Duma election	
Khakassia				
Khanty-Mansi Autonomous Okrug				
Kirov Oblast				
Komi				
Kostroma Oblast				
Krasnodar Krai			2022 Krasnodar Krai Legislative Assembly election	
Krasnoyarsk Krai				
Kurgan Oblast				
Kursk Oblast				
Leningrad Oblast				
Lipetsk Oblast				
Magadan Oblast				
Mari El			2024 Mari El State Assembly election	
Mordovia	7th State Assembly of Mordovia		2021 Mordovia State Assembly Election	
Moscow (city)			2024 Moscow City Duma election	
Moscow Oblast	7th State Legislature of Moscow Oblast		2021 Moscow Oblast Legislature election	
Murmansk Oblast				
Nenets Autonomous Okrug				
Nizhny Novgorod Oblast				
North Ossetia-Alania	7th Parliament of North Ossetia-Alania		2022 North Ossetia–Alania parliamentary election	
Novgorod Oblast				
Novosibirsk Oblast				
Omsk Oblast			2021 Omsk Oblast Legislative Assembly election	
Orenburg Oblast				
Oryol Oblast				
Penza Oblast				
Perm Krai				
Primorsky Krai				
Pskov Oblast				
Rostov Oblast				
Ryazan Oblast				
Saint Petersburg			2021 St. Petersburg Legislative Assembly election	
Sakha	6th State Assembly of the Sakha Republic	List of members of the 6th State Assembly of the Sakha Republic	2023 Sakha Republic State Assembly election	
Sakhalin Oblast				
Samara Oblast				
Saratov Oblast				
Sevastopol	2nd Legislative Assembly of Sevastopol		2019 Sevastopol Legislative Assembly elections	
Smolensk Oblast				
Stavropol Krai				
Sverdlovsk				
Tambov Oblast				
Tatarstan				
Tomsk Oblast				
Tula Oblast				
Tver Oblast				
Tyumen Oblast				
Tuva				
Udmurtia				
Ulyanovsk Oblast				
Vladimir Oblast				
Volgograd Oblast				
Vologda Oblast				
Voronezh Oblast				
Yamalo-Nenets				
Yaroslavl Oblast				
Zabaykalsky Krai				

=== Other subnational legislatures ===
Jurisdiction	Country	Session	Members	Last election	Source
Puntland	Somalia	6th Parliament of Puntland	66th	2023 Puntland parliamentary election	

== See also ==
- List of current presidents of legislatures
- List of current heads of state and government
- List of current United States State Legislatures
