= 1970s in Andorra =

1970s in Andorra:

== Events ==
- 1970: April 23- Andorran women gain the right to vote.
- 1971: Andorra organizes the Andorran Olympic Committee.
- 1972: The Sanctuary of Meritxell is destroyed with a fire.

295 vehicles recorded per 1000 inhabitants, ranking Andorra fourth in the world in its automobile/population ratio.

- 1973:Population of 24,807 recorded in Andorra.

Andorra's legislative assembly is reordered, ending the establishment of new letterbox enterprises by foreigners, thus effectively halting Andorra's function as a corporate tax haven.

- 1974: April 4-Contract signed between tobacco farmers and manufacturers.

The National Library of Andorra is founded in Andorra la Vella

- 1975: March 21-Spain issues a decree, originally published in September 1974, which requires the holders of French identity cards entering Spain from Andorra to produce passports.

May 14 -Andorra is accepted as a member of the world Olympic movement.

The National Archives of Andorra is founded in Andorra la Vella.

- 1976:The Sanctuary of Meritxell is rebuilt by Catalan architect Ricardo Bofill.
- 1978: The six Parishes of Andorra are expanded to seven, with the establishment of the parish of Escaldes-Engordany.
- 1979: December:Prenegotiations over the EC-Andorra Agreement as an Epiphenomenon of the Accession of Spain to the European Community are started in Brussels.
