= Casa de la Vall =

Historic former parliament building in Andorra la Vella, Andorra

- Former names: Casa Busquets

General information
- Type: Fortified manor house; former parliament building
- Location: Andorra la Vella, Andorra, Carrer de la Vall
- Coordinates: 42°30′24″N 1°31′14″E
- Completed: c. 1580
- Renovated: 1962; 2025–2026
- Owner: General Council of Andorra

Casa de la Vall (1882)

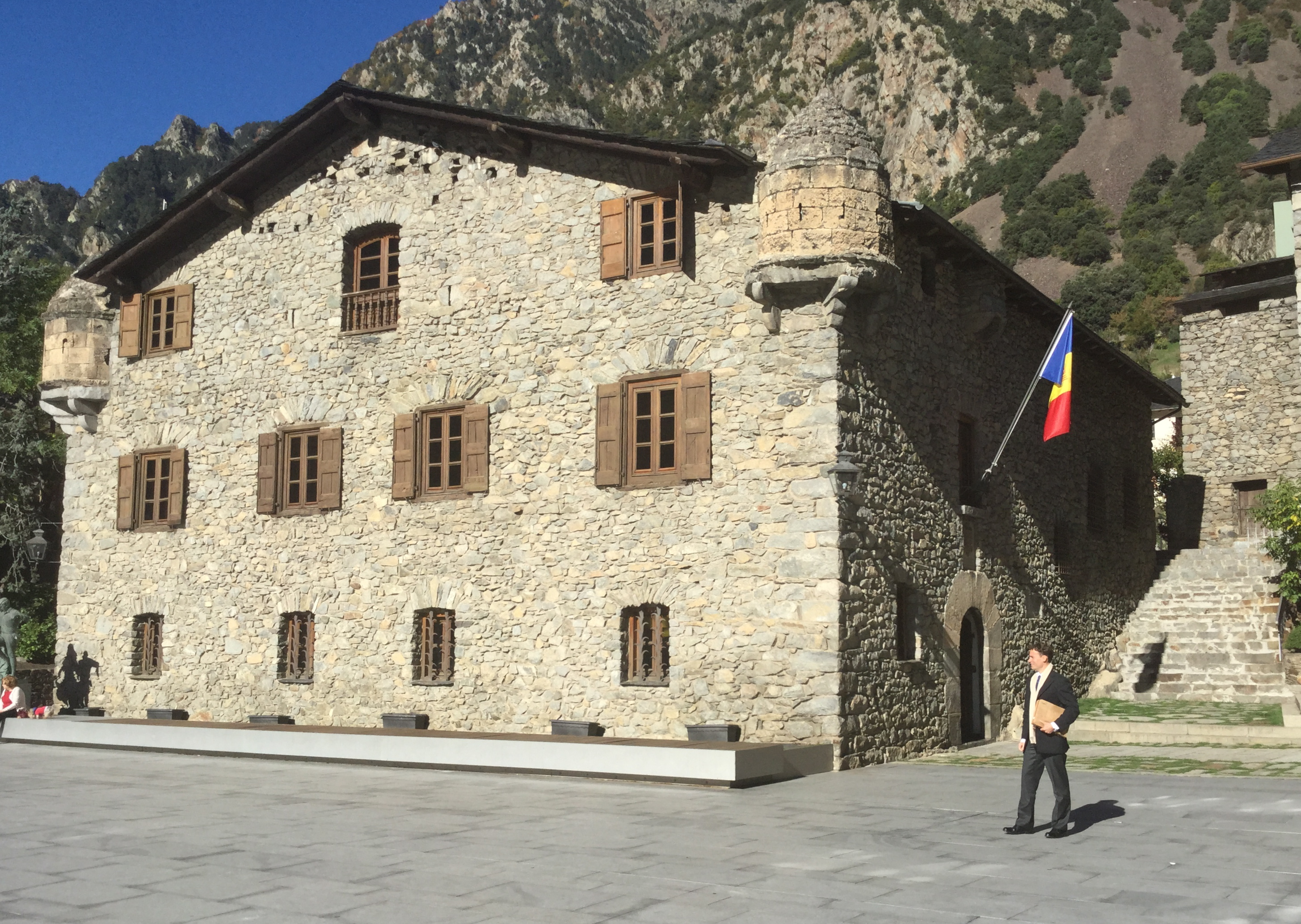
Casa de la Vall

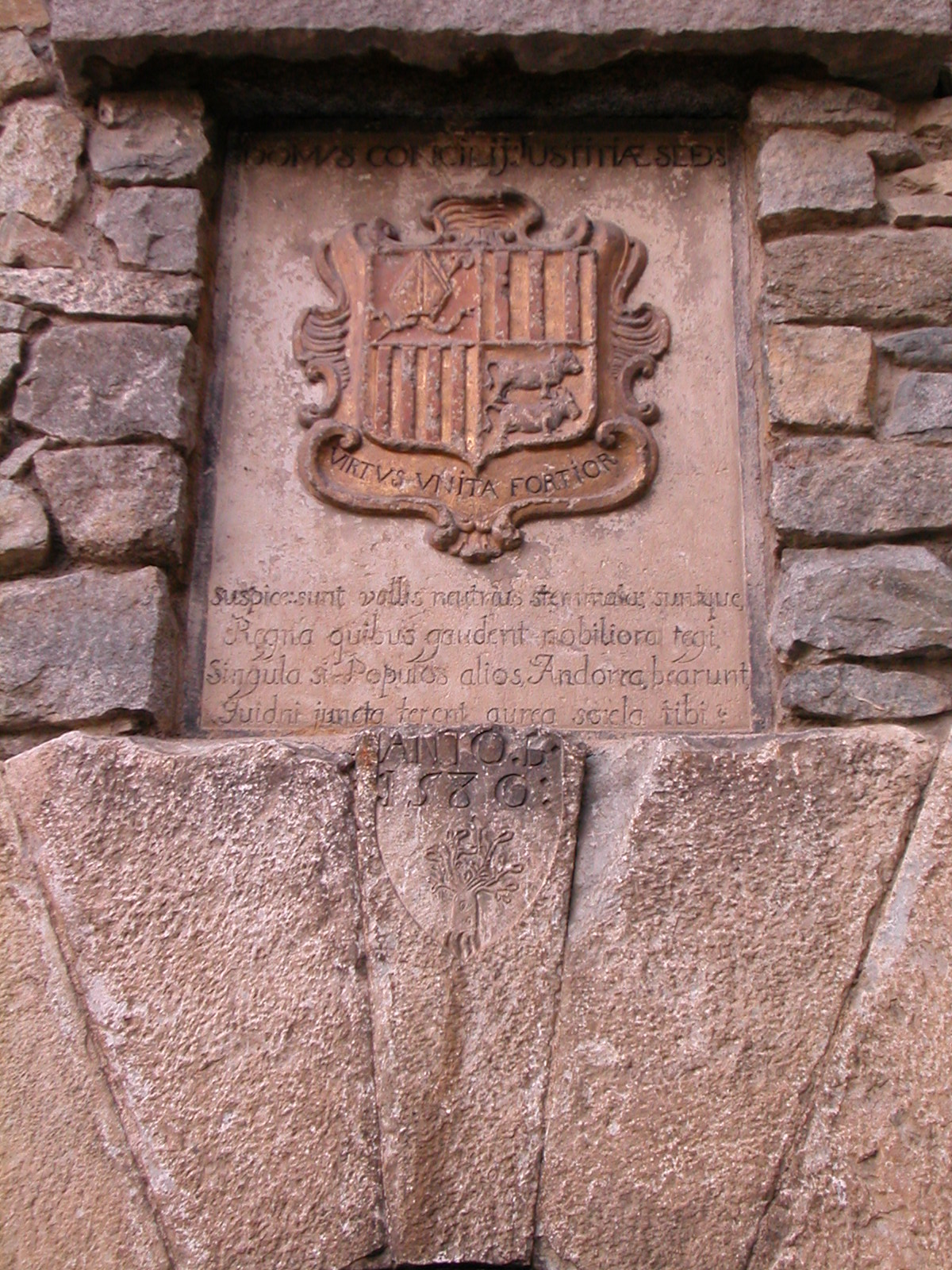
Coat of arms of Andorra

Meeting room in the Casa de la Vall

Casa de la Vall (lit. 'House of the Valley') is a historic building in Andorra la Vella, the capital of Andorra. Built in the late 16th century as the fortified manor house of the Busquets family, it was bought at the beginning of the 18th century by the Consell de la Terra (Council of the Land), the predecessor of the General Council. It was the seat of the Andorran parliament from 1702 until 2011, when the legislature moved to a new building next door. For most of that time it also housed the country's courts, and at different periods a prison, a parish meeting room, a school and lodgings for councillors.

The house combines the plan of a large Pyrenean farmhouse with defensive features such as corner turrets, machicolations and a tower. Its interior includes a hall with 16th-century wall paintings of the Passion, the former council chamber with its chapel, and the "Cupboard of the Seven Keys", the Council's historic archive. The building was heavily restored in the early 1960s, when its rendered walls were stripped to bare stone, and again in 2025–2026. It is protected as a bé d'interès cultural with the classification of monument, appears on the Andorran 1 euro coin, and is still used for ceremonial sittings of the General Council while being open to visitors.

== Name and setting ==
Casa de la Vall stands in the historic centre of Andorra la Vella on a rocky spur above a cliff, now known as the roc de la Vall, from which the house overlooked the valley and the approaches to the town. Before its acquisition by the Council it was known as Casa Busquets, after the family that built it. The Spanish official Francisco de Zamora, who visited in 1788, described it as the common house of the Valley, and the caption of a French engraving of 1888 styles it the palais des Vallées.

== History ==
=== Busquets house ===
The house was built for the Busquets family in the last quarter of the 16th century. The keystone of the entrance arch carries the family emblem (a tree), the date 1580 and an abbreviated form of the name Antoni Busquets, and that year is conventionally given as the date of construction. The General Council describes the property as having belonged to the family of a priest of that name. Pau Chica of the National Archives of Andorra notes that some authors, citing the art historian Marta Planas de la Maza, have argued that 1580 may record a thorough remodelling of an older house rather than its first construction. Besides the main house, the property included a barn (borda), a rectory, kitchen gardens, yards and a dovecote. It remained a private residence for more than a century.

=== Purchase by the Council of the Land ===
The Council of the Land originally had no fixed seat. According to the 18th-century Manual Digest and Politar Andorrà, assemblies were held in church porches and in the adjoining cemeteries. At an unknown date the Council obtained premises in Andorra la Vella, near Casa Guillemó and probably at the present Cap del Carrer, which it used until the beginning of the 18th century.

According to the General Council, the purchase of the Busquets house was agreed on 19 December 1701 for 1,650 lliures. The acquisition is generally dated to 1702. The house became the seat of both the Council and the Tribunal de Corts, the criminal court, and also provided a meeting room for the comú (parish council) of Andorra la Vella.

=== Seat of the Council and the courts ===
The building was adapted gradually to its new functions. The ground floor, formerly byres and cellars, became stabling for the councillors' mules and horses. In the 18th century a prison was installed there, with a room under the stairs for the executioner when one was required. The former bedrooms on the first floor became the council chamber, which until the 1960s was shared with the Tribunal de Corts.

Because sittings could last several days and were mostly held in autumn and winter, councillors ate in the kitchen and slept in the attic (cap de casa). The Council's minutes record that beds were installed there in 1758 at the request of the councillors of Ordino, and the attic was later divided into six rooms, one for each parish. The December sitting held around the feast of Saint Thomas was known as the Consell de la perdiu ("partridge council"), after the partridges that the parishes contributed and that were eaten on the occasion. The General Council describes this role as an inn for its members as perhaps unique. The kitchen and attic were used in this way until the 1930s.

Francisco de Zamora, who visited in September 1788, described a fairly large building with no ornament other than a strong tower on one side. He noted the archive of the Valley, secured by six locks whose keys were held by the consuls of the six parishes. In the 19th century the house drew foreign travellers, many of whom, according to the Andorran museum service, were struck by the austerity of the seat of government. An engraving after Gaston Vuillier, published in Le Tour du Monde in 1888, shows the building as it then stood.

=== Twentieth century ===
The first-floor room now used as the office of the síndic general (the Council's presiding officer) long served as the meeting room of the comú, and later, divided in two, housed a French school and a library. A dispute over the hiring of a public schoolmaster led to an agreement of 22 December 1920, by which the quart of Andorra la Vella gave up its rights to school premises in the building and the General Council ceded a prison building on the town square.

On 5 April 1933 a group of young Andorrans besieged the General Council while it was sitting in the house, an episode popularly remembered as having won universal male suffrage. The historian Gerhard Lang has argued that the 1933 revolution cannot be reduced to that day. In his account it must be understood together with the later ratification of the agreement, the proceedings against the Council before the Tribunal de Corts, and the dismissal of the entire Council in June. On 22 December 1942 the General Council declared official the national coat of arms "as it is above the entrance door of Casa de la Vall", together with the anthem and the flag.

In the early 1960s the building was comprehensively remodelled under the Catalan architect Joaquim Ros de Ramis, assisted by Josep Canela. Official accounts date the work to 1962, while some press accounts give 1963. Externally, the render that had originally covered the walls was removed to expose the stonework, a second corner turret was added to balance the existing one, and a new entrance was opened at the rear. Internally, the Tribunal de Corts was moved to the ground floor and the council chamber was refurnished with seats set in a curve like choir stalls. The prison was transferred to a new building against the rock, linked to the house by an underground passage, where it remained until 2005. From then until 1993 the ground floor housed the country's judicial bodies.

Four seats were added to the chamber's 24 after the creation of the parish of Escaldes-Engordany in 1978. After the separation of executive and legislative powers in 1982, the head of government and ministers sat at a table in the centre. In 1991 and 1992 the attic hosted the meetings of the Tripartite Commission, made up of representatives of the two co-princes and a delegation of the General Council, which drafted the Constitution of 1993.

=== New parliament building and ceremonial use ===
The 1993 Constitution allows the General Council between 28 and 42 members. The protected building could not be enlarged to seat 42 councillors, and the Council had already expanded into neighbouring buildings. It therefore commissioned a new seat beside the old one from the architects Pere Espuga, Ramon Artigues and Ramon Sanàbria, winners of an international competition. The new building was completed in 2011.

Since then Casa de la Vall has been kept for traditional and ceremonial sittings, notably the Saint Thomas session in December, the Constitution Day session and the constituent sitting of each legislature. It is open to the public for guided visits.

=== Restoration of 2025–2026 ===
In 2024 the General Council prepared a master plan, directed by the conservator Eudald Guillamet, for the first comprehensive works since the 1960s. The stated aim was to present the building less as an ethnographic museum and more as the seat of the Andorran parliament, and the kitchen was remodelled first as a trial. The project was awarded to the architect Enric Dilmé after a national competition, with the restoration budget then estimated at €1.2 million.

The interior works ran from spring to December 2025. They renewed the building services, added a lift and a ramp, and replaced the textured wall coatings of the 1960s with lime mortar. Underfloor heating was laid beneath a new parquet floor over the earlier paving. Wall paintings, furniture and other objects were restored under the supervision of the Ministry of Culture. In the chamber the seats were rearranged symmetrically and a new table was made for the Government. An altar and other recent additions were removed from the chapel area, where the old chest-archive of the six keys was installed. The plan ruled out re-rendering the façades.

The building was inaugurated on 22 December 2025 with the Saint Thomas session and reopened to visitors the following day. By mid-April 2026 more than 5,000 people had visited since the reopening.

A second phase was put out to tender in May 2026 with a base budget of nearly €970,000. It covers the roofs, towers and dovecote, external joinery and building services, and the conversion of the attic into an exhibition space on the history of Andorra's institutions. In parallel, the ground behind the building, formerly gardens and a car park, is being remodelled in phases. The scheme includes an open-air amphitheatre for about 250 people and new accessible routes. The first phase, earthworks, was awarded in December 2024 for €1.04 million, and the second for just over €2 million.

== Architecture ==
=== Exterior ===
The Andorran heritage inventory classes Casa de la Vall as vernacular architecture (arquitectura popular). It follows the type of the large Pyrenean manor house of the early modern period: a compact, almost square block with thick walls, its main front facing south. The interior is divided into three structural bays in the manner of the large farmhouses (masos) of the 16th century.

The house has an unusual array of defensive features. There is a machicolation over the main door and others on the rear façade, corner turrets with loopholes, and further loopholes in the upper walls. A defensive tower with a hipped roof is attached to the rear, commanding the old royal road (camí ral) into the town. A separate dovecote stands beside the house.

The Gran Enciclopèdia Catalana characterises the building as mixed architecture with defensive attributes of medieval tradition. Marta Planas cites it as an example of how strictly medieval building traditions persisted in Andorran architecture in the 16th century.

=== Heraldry and inscriptions ===
Three carved stones mark the main entrance. The keystone of the arch bears the Busquets emblem and the date 1580. Above the door is the coat of arms of Andorra in its quartered form: the mitre and crozier of the bishop of Urgell, the bars of Catalonia and of Foix, and the cows of Béarn. Antoni Fiter i Rossell's Manual Digest (1748) describes it as carved "in the present year", although the Politar Andorrà dates its installation to 1761. It is accompanied by a Latin verse inscription, opening with words meaning "House of the Council, seat of Justice", and by the motto Virtus unita fortior.

To the right of the door is an older, horizontal relief. It shows the mitre and crozier above the arms of Béarn and Foix, flanked by two crosses, and is signed Escoter me fecit ("Escoter made me"). It is regarded as the oldest surviving representation of the Andorran arms. Following Pere Canturri and Jean-Pierre Lassalle, it is thought to date from the 17th century at the latest and to have been brought from the Council's earlier seat when the house became a public building. It stood to the left of the door until the restoration of the 1960s.

On the arms above the door the cows of Béarn face the opposite way from normal heraldic usage. The 1942 declaration made this detail official, but later practice reversed it, and it has been attributed to a sculptor's error.

=== Interior ===
The ground floor contains the entrance hall, formerly the stables, and the courtroom of the Tribunal de Corts. Fragments of 17th-century wall painting showing the Crucifixion and the earthly paradise are displayed by the stairs. The oldest surviving Andorran flag, a linen flag of the late 19th century, is shown at the entrance.

The principal first-floor room is the Sala dels Passos Perduts ("hall of lost steps"). In mountain houses this room (soler) was the centre of family and social life, and it served councillors as an antechamber to the sittings. Its walls carry a cycle of mural paintings of the Passion, dated to the 16th century, running from the Agony in the Garden to the Crucifixion, with a Pietà by a different hand. The paintings originally decorated the adjoining room, traditionally called the "bishop's room" and now the síndic's office. According to the museum service they were transferred to the hall in 1956. Restoration of the cycle was nearing completion in May 2026.

The síndic's office holds mural paintings of the Trinity and the Last Supper brought from the church of Sant Romà dels Vilars. A cupboard in the same room held the archive of the old parish of Andorra. It had two locks, one for each of the parish's two quarts, Andorra la Vella and Escaldes-Engordany, and was used until the parish was divided in 1978. Its contents, more than 5,500 documents, were deposited in the National Archives in 1996.

The kitchen has a central open hearth beneath a large hood, a bread oven and a traditional dresser (escudeller). Since 2024 it has been presented with 19th-century pewter tableware, on the basis of travellers' descriptions.

The council chamber occupies the former bedrooms of the house. At one end is a chapel dedicated to Saint Ermengol, an 11th-century bishop of Urgell, where prayers were said at the opening of sittings. It contains a Baroque image of the saint and the late-17th-century "councillors' triptych", in which the Crucifixion is flanked by the emblems of the co-princes.

The chamber also holds the Cupboard of the Seven Keys (armari de les Set Claus), the Council's former archive. When the Council moved into the house the cupboard was fitted with six locks and inscribed with the names of the six parishes. It gained a seventh lock after the creation of Escaldes-Engordany, and it can be opened only when the keys of all the parishes are present. It held the Council's correspondence, minute and account books, privileges and judgments, which were transferred to the National Archives in 1993. A volume of minutes for 1743–1864, missing from the cupboard since the early 20th century, was recovered in 2024. The cupboard's predecessor, a pine chest with six locks used when the Council had no fixed seat, is also kept in the building.

=== Surroundings ===
The former front yard is now the Plaça del Consell General, laid out in 2011 as part of the new parliament building project. Monuments around the house mark stages in Andorran constitutional history. A sculpture by Luigi Terruggi was commissioned for the seventh centenary, in 1978, of the pariatge of 1278. Josep Viladomat's pair of dancers commemorates the Nova Reforma of 1866, and a monument by Emili Armengol commemorates the 1993 Constitution. Jaume Plensa's Set poetes can be seen from the lookout on the square.

== Heritage status and assessment ==
Casa de la Vall is a bé d'interès cultural (asset of cultural interest), the category that Andorran law reserves for the most significant heritage assets, with the classification of monument. The Cultural Heritage Act of 2003 brought into that category the properties previously declared of national interest under ordinances of 1964 and 1970. Its annex lists Casa de la Vall among the monuments of the parish of Andorra la Vella.

The restoration of the 1960s has been reassessed by later architects and historians. Enric Dilmé and the historian Quim Valera have described the exposed stonework as a "historical fake" (fals històric) typical of the restoration fashions of the 20th century. They point out that prosperous houses of this kind were traditionally rendered and that the building had never before had this appearance. In Dilmé's account the architects made the house grander through new elements and symmetries it had never had. Its new image then became a model for Andorran building, culminating in a 1982 requirement that new construction be faced in stone.

Those responsible for the 2025 works described the interiors of the 1960s, with their renders, dark woodwork and monumentalising treatment, as products of the taste of their time. They chose to distinguish and edit the building's historical layers rather than remove them wholesale, and stressed that their own additions were reversible.

== In culture ==
Official and press accounts describe Casa de la Vall as one of Andorra's principal institutional symbols. The museum service observes that the most representative building of the principality is a house rather than a palace, which it relates to the rural roots of the institutions that occupied it. The building is depicted on the national side of the Andorran 1 euro coin.

== See also ==
- New Parliament of Andorra
- General Council of Andorra
- Cultural Heritage of Andorra
