= GIPA =

GIPA may refer to:

- The Georgia Indoor Percussion Association (GIPA), a fine arts competitive program based in Georgia.
- The Georgian Institute of Public Affairs (GIPA), an academic institution based in Tbilisi, Georgia.
- The Grup d'Intervenció Policia d'Andorra (GIPA), a paramilitary special services unit of the Police Corps of Andorra.
- The Greater Involvement of People Living with HIV (GIPA), a United Nations working policy administered by the Joint United Nations Programme on HIV/AIDS.
