= Paréage of Andorra (1278) =

1278 charter granting joint sovereignty over Andorra

The first Paréage of Andorra (Catalan: Tractat de pareatge) was a feudal charter signed in Lleida on 8 September 1278. It codified a lay and ecclesiastical agreement between the Count of Foix, Roger-Bernard III, and the Bishop of Urgell, Pere d'Urtx, establishing their joint sovereignty over the territory of Andorra. The paréage established the system of condominium in Andorra, placing it under suzerainty of both lords. This system was later ratified in 1993 by the signing of the Constitution of Andorra. The charter underpins the modern legal status of Andorra.

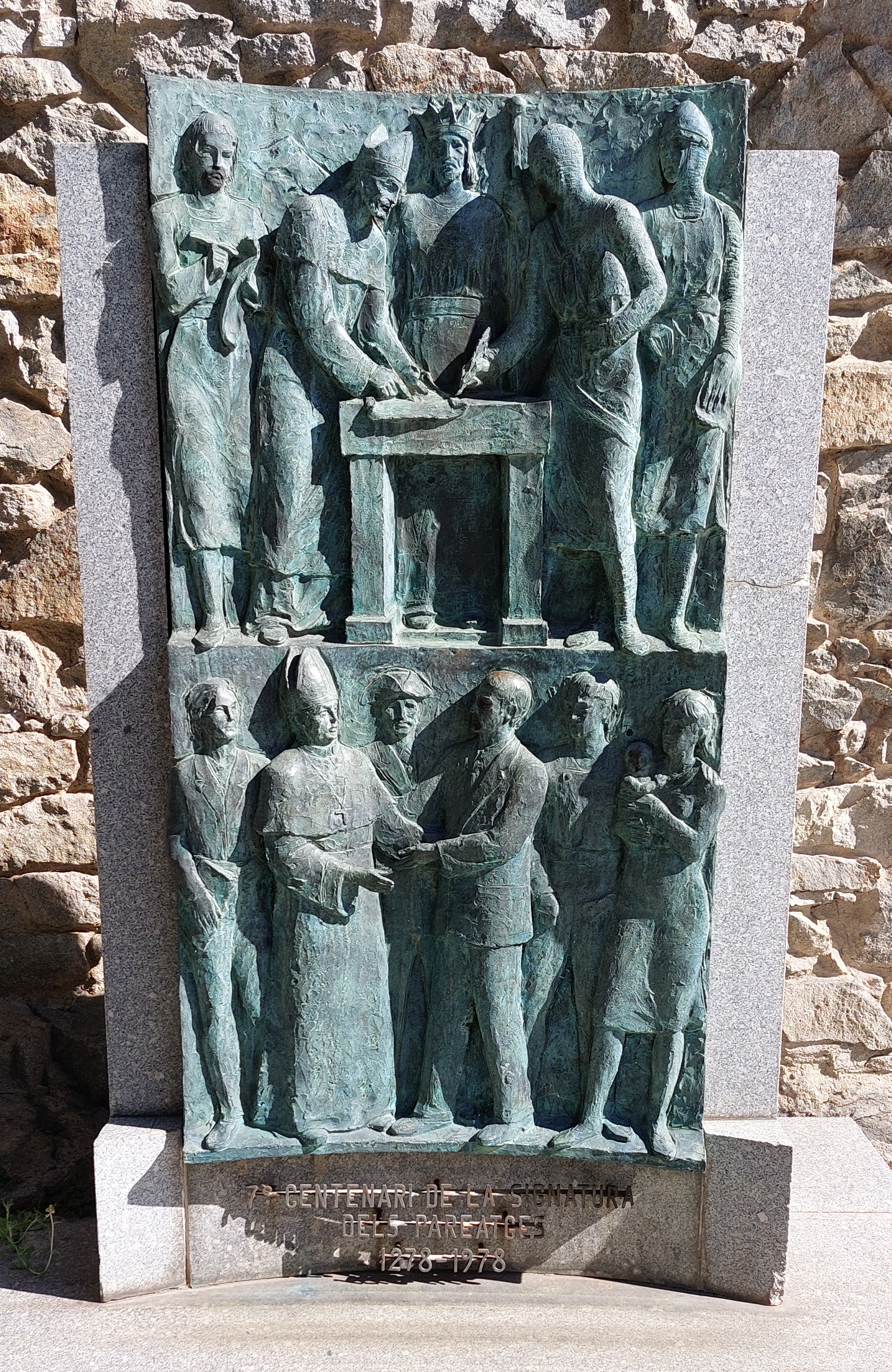
Sculpture at Casa de la Vall commemorating the 700th anniversary of the signature of the Paréages

A second paréage was signed on 6 November 1288, which supplemented and addressed a number of clauses in the first paréage. Together, these two paréages comprised the first basic law of Andorra, and were the nation's most important constitutional documents until the ratification of the Constitution in 1993.

Following a series of marriages, the titles of the Count of Foix, including his co-lordship over Andorra, passed to the French monarch when Henry IV of Béarn, Count of Foix and King of Navarre, became King of France. Henry IV was therefore the first French king to also be Co-Prince of Andorra, a title which would eventually pass to today's president. With the Constitution in 1993, the system of government was then modified to provide for a parliamentary democracy, in which the rulers remained as ceremonial heads of state.

There is only one copy of each of the paréages in existence. The copy of the first paréage is kept at the Arxiu Històric Nacional in Andorra. Its original, which was kept at the Archives of the Château de Foix, in Ariège, is thought to have been destroyed during a fire in the 20th century. The second paréage is held at the Arxiu Diocesà i Capitular d'Urgell, in La Seu d'Urgell, Catalonia, Spain. The original was kept in the town of Tournai, and was destroyed with the rest of the archives when the town was bombed in 1940 during World War II.

The paréages remained in force unadjusted for seven centuries. In 1978, to mark the 7th centenary of the signing of the paréage, the French postal service issued a stamp showing the preamble of the Acte of 1278.
