= Mercè Bonell =

Andorran politician

Mercè Bonell i Bertran
- Occupation: Politician
- Political party: Liberal Party of Andorra

Mercè Bonell i Bertran is an Andorran politician. She became the first female member of the General Council after replacing a councilor on 20 November 1984, an office she held until 1986. She was member of the Liberal Party of Andorra. She was a pioneer for Andorran women in politics. Mercè Bonell was appointed to replace a councilor in the General Council in 1984, just eleven years after women had become elibile in Andorra in 1973, and fourteen years after the introduction of women's suffrage in 1970. Since she was appointed, she was not the first woman elected: that was Maria Teresa Armengol in 1986. Women were rare in the Andorran General Council until the election of 2005.
