= Meritxell Palmitjavila =

Andorran politician (born 1964)

The Most Excellent Meritxell Palmitjavila MP

Deputy General Syndic of the General Council of Andorra
- In office 2 May 2019 – 26 April 2023
- Monarchs: Episcopal Co-prince: Joan Enric Vives Sicília; French Co-prince: Emmanuel Macron
- President: Roser Suñé Pascuet (General Syndic)
- Representative: Episcopal: Josep Maria Mauri; French: Patrick Strzoda
- Preceded by: Mònica Bonell Tuset
- Succeeded by: Sandra Codina

Personal details
- Born: 20 December 1964 (age 61)
- Party: Democrats for Andorra
- Occupation: Philologist, teacher and politician

Meritxell Palmitjavila Naudí (born 20 December 1964) is an Andorran teacher and politician, Deputy General Syndic of the General Council of Andorra between 2019 and 2023.

== Career ==
She had been teacher in several Andorran schools between 1985 and 2015. Between 2009 and 2010 she was the Director of the Department of Support to Education and Educational Inspection by the Ministry of Education.

Palmitjavila is member of the General Council since was elected in the 2015 Andorran parliamentary election.

In the 2019 Andorran parliamentary election she head the Democrats for Andorra in the parish of Canillo and was re-elected lawmaker.

As she was the older member of the General Council, she presided the session of constitution of the new Parliament on 2 May 2019, where was elected Deputy General Syndic. She was succeeded by Sandra Codina on 26 April 2023.
