= National Archives of Andorra =

Coordinates: 42.5062371°N 1.5232949°E

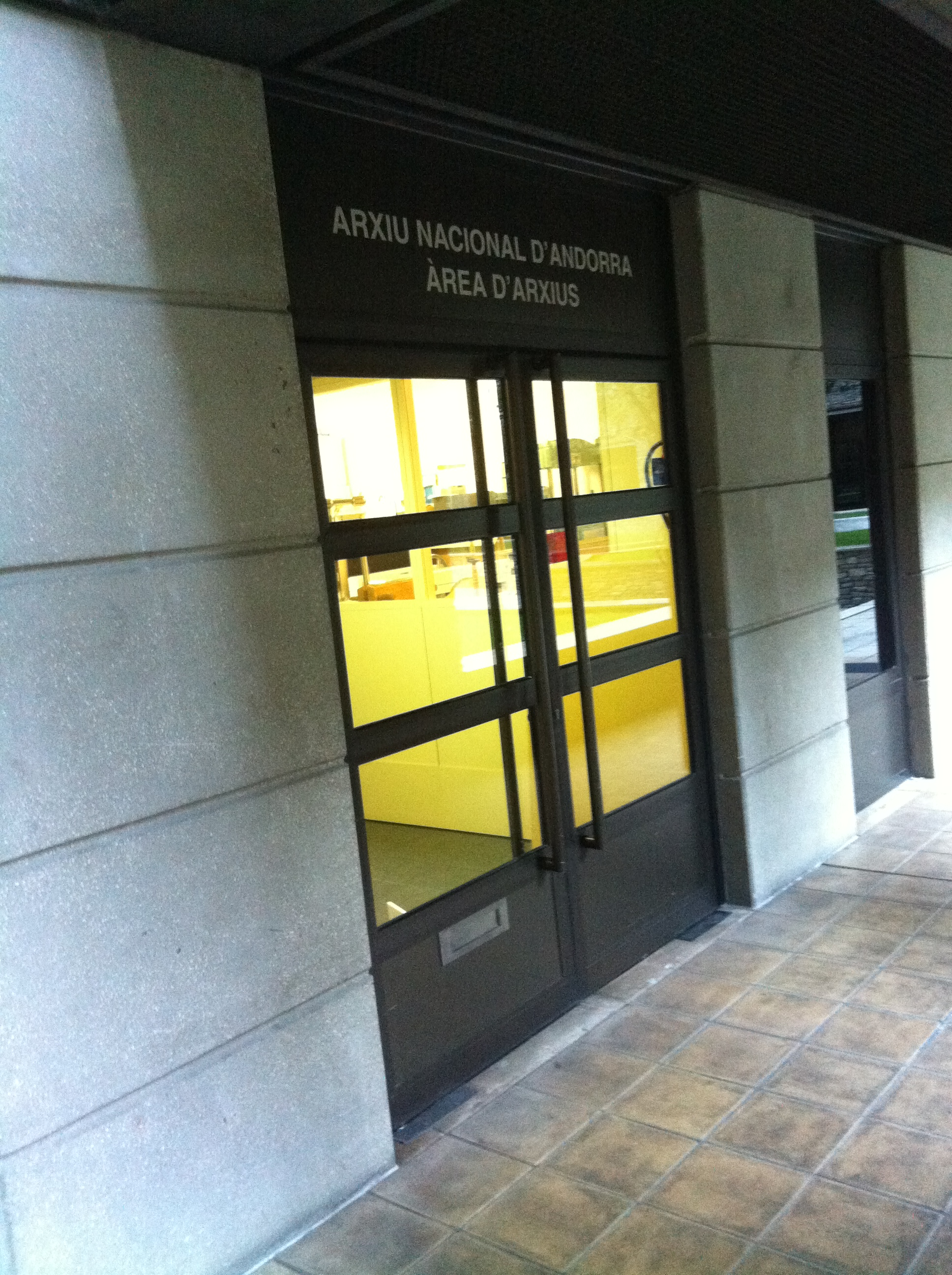
National Archives of Andorra

The National Archives of Andorra (Catalan: Arxiu Nacional d'Andorra) were established in 1975 as an archival system of the Government of Andorra allows people to research letters, reports, notes, memos, photographs, and other primary sources. The Archives and Documents Management Area is attached to the Ministry of Culture, and the building is located in Andorra la Vella.

== History ==
The archives were established in 1975 under the direction of historian and civil servant Lídia Armengol i Vila. The archives are located in Andorra la Vella.

The archival system of the Government of Andorra allows people to research letters, reports, notes, memos, photographs, and other primary sources. In the case of Andorra, it is a collection of cultural artifacts collected for and by Andorrans.

Typically, records there address the planning, control, use, conservation, and transfer or disposal of documentation with the aim of streamlining and unifying treatment and achieving effective and efficient management. The basic elements of the general system are the functional classification tables, inventories, evaluation tables and transfer sheets.

The Archives and Documents Management Area is attached to the Ministry of Culture and is the globalizing unit of archival practices. It represents the management of the entire Archives System of the Government of Andorra. The archives produced a documentary on the work of Jordi Sasplugas Mateu, 'El mirador d'Andorra', which explored the television work of the director.
