= Police Corps of Andorra =

Police Corps of Andorra Cos de Policia d’Andorra
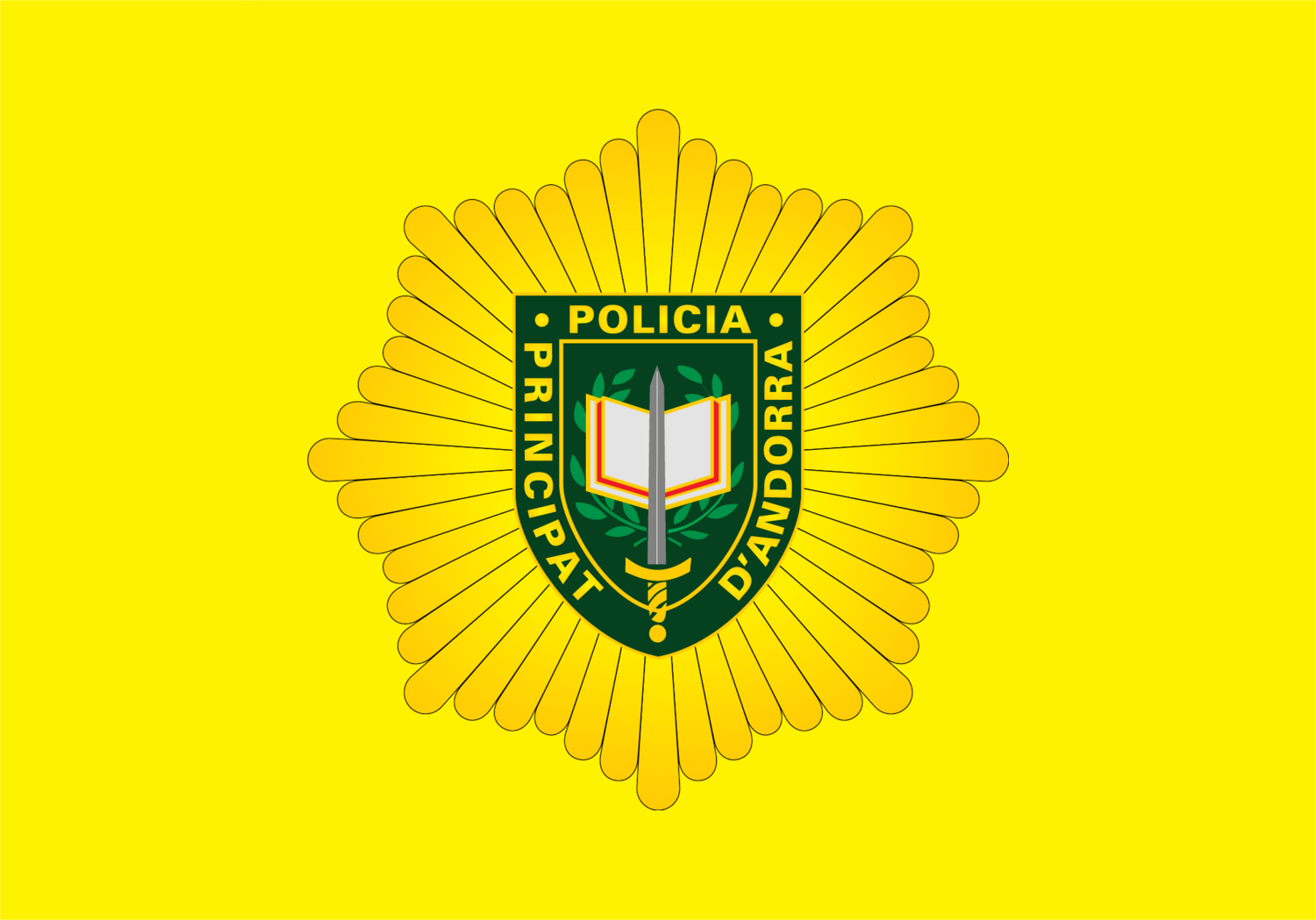
- Flag

Agency overview
- Formed: 1932
- Preceding agency: Servei d'Ordre

Jurisdictional structure
- National agency: Andorra
- Operations jurisdiction: Andorra
- Population: 85,000
- Governing body: Government of Andorra
- Constituting instrument: Constitution of Andorra
- General nature: Civilian police

Operational structure
- Overseen by: Directorate of the Police
- Headquarters: Ctra. de l'Obac s/n, Escaldes-Engordany, Andorra
- Sworn members: 300

Website
- www.policia.ad

The Police Corps of Andorra (Catalan: Cos de Policia d’Andorra) is the national police of Andorra. In 2007, the force had 240 officers serving a population of approximately 85,000.

== Structure ==
The police force consists of the Directorate of the Police, four divisions which carry out the various missions of the police, and two "functional groups".

=== Directorate of the Police ===
Location of the central police station in Escaldes-Engordany

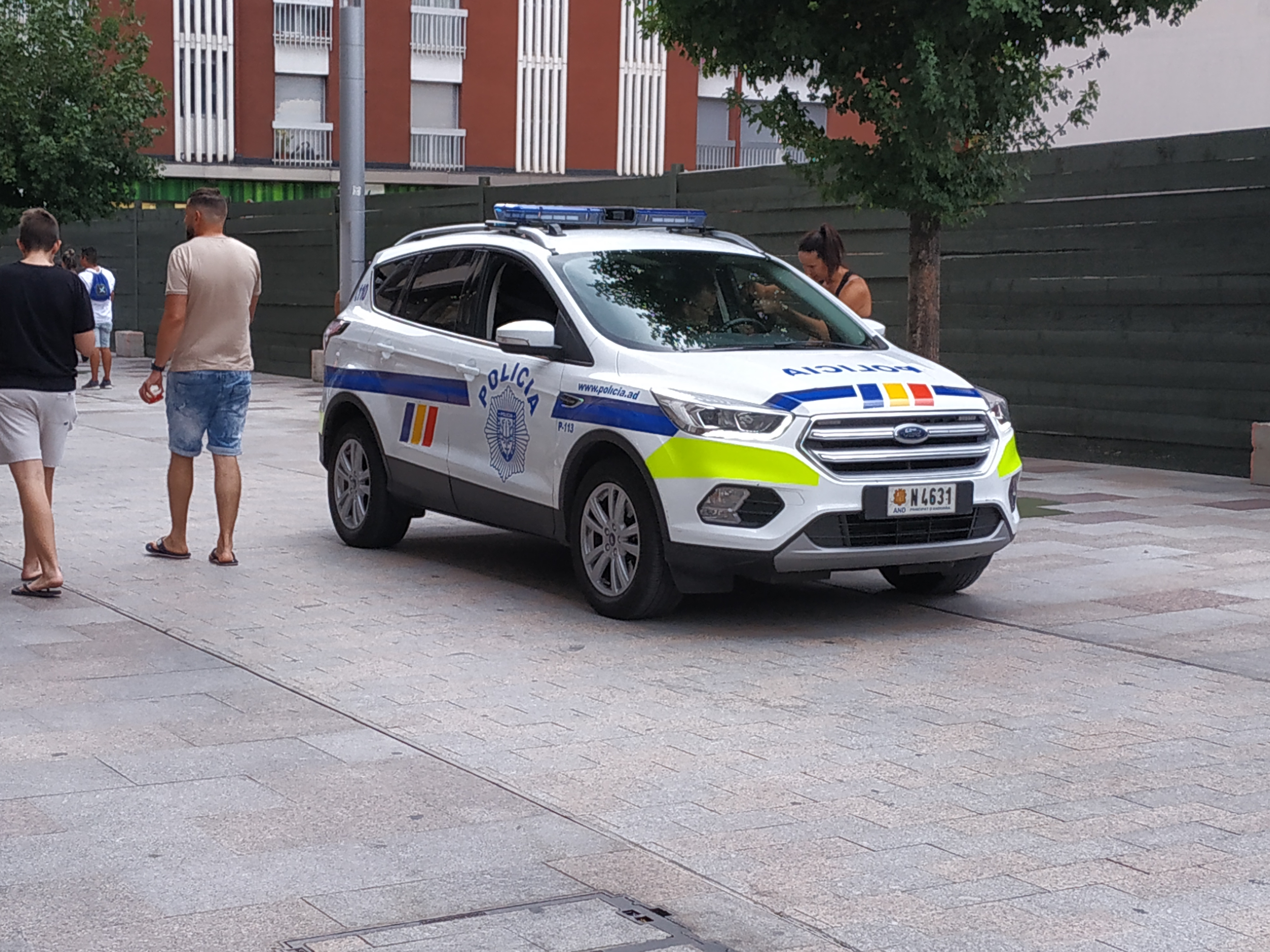
Police car in Andorra la Vella

The Directorate of the Police is composed of a director, a deputy director who has the grade of police commissioner, a secretary, a planning and human resources officer and an administrative assistant. It directs police activities throughout the country. Its members are nominated by the Government of Andorra based on proposals from the Ministry of the Interior. The International Police Cooperation Office is part of the Directorate of Police, inside is the National Central Office of Interpol.

=== Divisions ===
There are four divisions with the following responsibilities:

- The Division of Criminal Police (similar to Kriminalpolizei) is in charge of criminal investigations and divided into two investigation units. The first one, responsible for investigations aimed both at prevention and repression of crime, has sections dealing with drugs, domestic violence, organised crime, general affairs, juveniles, and money laundering. The second investigates crimes brought to its attention and is also responsible for cases of climate accidents.
- The Division of Public Security and Proximity comprises two uniformed units whose role is to ensure the overall safety and security of residents. The Unit for Citizens' Security is a police patrol unit intended to prevent offences and maintain public order. The Unit for Citizens' Awareness, a detachment of the central police, operates the Information Room, answers public queries, coordinates external services and supervises detention conditions.
- The Division of Police Support is responsible for operational support to the other divisions, as well as to the Directorate. It comprises six departments: analysis of criminal information; legal matters; information technology; training; prevention and social orientation; and management.
- The Division of Transit and Borders comprises two uniformed units: the Traffic Unit (similar to highway patrol, motorcycle patrols to supervise the movement of vehicles at the national borders and intervene in case of accidents) and the Borders Unit (a border guard in charge of border immigration control) that works in co-operation with the Department of Immigration.

=== Groups ===
Six groups – for the protection of VIPs, bomb disposal, order maintenance, emergency situations, sniffer-dog training and mountain rescue – are formed by members of the four Divisions; are assembled in response to specific needs; and are assisted by colleagues from neighbouring countries, particularly in organising joint training programmes.

=== GIPA ===
The Grup d'Intervenció Policia d'Andorra' (GIPA) is a small special forces squad trained in counter-terrorism, and hostage recovery tasks. It is the paramilitary component of the Police Corps. Although it is the closest Andorran organization in style to an active military force, it is a civilian, not a military organization. As terrorist and hostage situations are a rare threat to the country, the GIPA is commonly assigned to prisoner escort duties, and at other times to routine policing.

== Police inventory ==
=== Ground vehicles ===
- Fiat Panda
- SEAT Altea
- SEAT León
- Škoda Superb
- Renault Laguna II

=== Small arms ===
Grup d'Intervenció Policia d'Andorra (GIPA) is the more heavily armed tactical team of the force. They are more armed than the average officer; these are some of the weapons they are issued:

Weapon	Origin	Type	Notes
PAMAS G1	France	Semi-automatic pistol	Retired
SIG Pro	Switzerland	Semi-automatic pistol	Standard issue
Heckler & Koch MP5	Germany	Submachine gun	Standard issue
Benelli M4	Italy	Shotgun	Standard issue

== Ranks ==
=== Functions ===
Police Corps of Andorra
Police Corps of Andorra	Director del Cos	Director adjunt del Cos

=== Grades ===
	Superior level		Executive level		Intermediate level			Basic level
Police Corps of Andorra
Police Corps of Andorra	Commissari major	Commissari	Inspector major	Inspector	Sergent major primer	Sergent major	Sergent	Agent major de policia	Agent de policia
