= Jordi Jordana Rossell =

Andorran lawyer and politician

Jordi Jordana Rossell (born 8 March 1960) is an Andorran lawyer and politician. He is a member of the Liberal Party of Andorra. He has worked as a judge and heads a small law firm.
