= New Parliament of Andorra =

- Nou Consell General
- Interactive map of the New Parliament of Andorra area

General information
- Classification: Parliament
- Location: Andorra la Vella, Andorra
- Coordinates: 42.5066111°N 1.5211111°E
- Opened: 2011
- Inaugurated: 2014; 12 years ago

The New Parliament of Andorra (Catalan: Nou Parlament d'Andorra) or New General Council (Catalan: Nou Consell General) is the headquarters of the General Council of Andorra since 2011. It is located in Andorra la Vella, near the government headquarters, and it replaces the previous parliament in Casa de la Vall.

Ordinary sessions take place in the New Parliament of Andorra, whereas traditional sessions (the constitutive session or the Sant Tomàs session) take place in Casa de la Vall.

== History ==

In 1996, during the first constitutional term, a commission was created to design a new headquarters for the General Council of Andorra located in Casa de la Vall, which was too small to hold parliamentary sessions. The new parliament opened in 2011, and it was inaugurated by the Co-Princes of Andorra in 2014.
