= Carine Montaner =

Andorran politician

Carine Montaner Raynaud (French pronunciation: [kaʁin mɔ̃tane ʁɛno], born 6 June 1978) is an Andorran politician who has served in the General Council since 2015.

== Biography ==
Born in Toulouse, France, Montaner obtained a master's degree in Economic Sciences and Business Management, and another in Economic and Social Engineering of Territorial Policies, both from the University of Toulouse. She became a professor at the Universitat d'Andorra. She has served in Andorra's delegation as an associate member of the Assemblée parlementaire de la Francophonie. She was elected to the General Council in 2015, as a member of the Liberal Party of Andorra (PLA; now Liberals of Andorra) and Lauredian Union (UL). She was second on the party's list in Sant Julià de Lòria; they won in the parish with 47% of the vote.

Montaner was re-elected in 2019 in the same parish, again behind Josep Majoral on the list, but this time for the Third Way (TV) and UL. She left the party in March 2021 due to disagreements with leader Josep Pintat Forné on the handling of the COVID-19 pandemic; Montaner opposed vaccine passports, believed vaccines to be "experimental" and opposed vaccination for the young. Days later, she launched the new party Andorra Forward (AE).

Ahead of the 2023 election, Montaner proposed solving Andorra's housing crisis by affordably renting the principality's 6,000 foreign-owned empty properties, limiting immigration, a referendum on the country's abortion law (as of the election, it was one of three European countries with no legal abortion), a referendum on permitting dual nationality, and neutrality on international issues including the Russian invasion of Ukraine. With 16% of the vote, the party won three seats including Montaner, all from the national list.
