= Cerni Escalé =

Andorran politician

Member of the General Council
- Incumbent
- Assumed office 26 April 2023

Chairman of Concord
- Incumbent
- Assumed office 6 July 2022

Personal details
- Born: 23 June 1987 (age 39) Andorra la Vella, Andorra
- Party: Concord (since 2022); Independent (before 2022)
- Education: Pompeu Fabra University; Columbia University

Cerni Escalé Cabré (born 23 June 1987) is an Andorran politician who heads the Concord political party. He is the Leader of the Opposition of Andorra since his election to the General Council (Andorran national parliament) in 2023 as well as a deputy to the Parliamentary Assembly of the Council of Europe.

== Biography ==
Escalé was born to a mother who was a teacher and a father who was a ski and tennis instructor. He partially attributes his political views to being educated in the Andorran system, rather than the French and Spanish curricula that are also available in the principality.

Escalé graduated in political sciences from the Pompeu Fabra University, then obtained a master's certificate in European law from Sciences Po after being admitted on a scholarship from the Generalitat de Catalunya. He achieved a masters in public administration from Columbia University as a Fulbright scholar. He worked for a year for Moody's Investors Service and then returned to Andorra to work in the ministries of foreign affairs and the presidency.

Escalé moved to Dominica as a Red Cross volunteer with the indigenous Carib people, while studying how small states function. He worked for six years at the World Bank, restructuring debt in Argentina and supervising the fund in the 2014 Ebola crisis. After returning to Andorra, he became general secretary of the Escaldes–Engordany parish.

In July 2022, Escalé left his municipal office to found the political party Concord. In November, he was announced as their candidate for prime minister of Andorra in the 2023 election. His party took over 21% of the vote and five seats, second behind the 16 seats and 32% of the governing Democrats for Andorra; they were the most voted party in the Sant Julià de Lòria parish.

In his parliamentary role, Escalé is the President of the Committee on Justice, the Interior and Institutional Affairs, as well as the Vice-president of the Committee on Finance and the Budget of the General Council. Cerni Escalé has the highest public political rating in national polls among Andorran politicians, standing at 6.5 (2024) and 6.4 (2025) out of 10, at a distance from the Prime Minister, Xavier Espot Zamora (Democrats for Andorra, 5.6).

== Political views ==
Escalé proposes limits on purchase of property in Andorra by foreigners, believing that this would make housing more affordable for citizens. He believes that Andorra's relations with the European Union must involve caps on migration and foreign investment for the sake of maintaining a sustainable growth in the country. He considers himself "europositive", and praises EU institutions, while claiming that new approaches are necessary in order to achieve mutually beneficial relations between the EU and micro-states.

Escalé proposes the immediate legalisation of abortion in Andorra. When questioned on whether this could be vetoed by one of the country's co-princes, the Bishop of Urgell, he answered that it only needed the approval of the other co-prince, the President of France. He has said that renewal of residency permits after one year should be dependent on knowledge of the Catalan language, but that length of residency for naturalisation should be amended from 20 consecutive years to 15 non-consecutive years. He and his party refuse to comment on foreign issues, including the Catalan independence movement.
