= Andorra Forward =

Andorra Forward Andorra Endavant
- Abbreviation: AE
- Leader: Carine Montaner Raynaud
- Founder: Carine Montaner Raynaud
- Founded: 18 November 2021
- Split from: Third Way
- Ideology: Conservatism; Populism; Souverainism; Euroscepticism
- Political position: Right-wing
- Colours: Blue; Yellow; Red
- General Council: 3 / 28

Website
- www.andorraendavant.info

Andorra Forward (Catalan: Andorra Endavant) is an Andorran political party founded on 18 November 2021 by deputy Carine Montaner Raynaud, who previously left the Third Way party.

== History ==
In September 2021, Montaner left the Third Way and announced the creation of her own party.

On 18 November 2021, Montaner officially announced the creation of the Andorra Forward party. Montaner explained in a press release that "the DNA of the party" is based on six points and places first "the freedom of the people as a fundamental right damaged in this COVID period, a right that we will defend with cloak and sword". The rest of the elements are citizen participation, responsibility with a law of political responsibility, true transparency, the separation of powers and a deep reform of justice and meritocracy.

In the 2023 parliamentary election, the party won 16% of the vote and 3 seats in the General Council.

== Election results ==
=== General Council elections ===
Election	Leader	Votes	%	Seats	+/–	Position	Government
2023	Carine Montaner Raynaud	3,067	16.00	3 / 28	New	4th	Opposition
