= Pere López Agràs =

Andorran politician

His Excellency Pere López Agràs
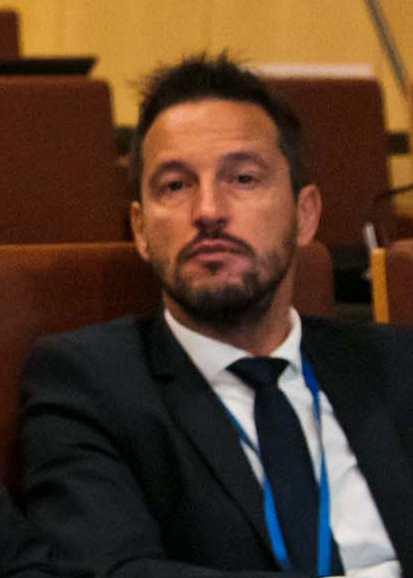

Acting Prime Minister of Andorra
- In office 28 April 2011 – 12 May 2011
- Monarchs: Episcopal Co-prince: Joan Enric Vives Sicília; French Co-prince: Nicolas Sarkozy
- Representative: Episcopal Co-prince: Nemesi Marqués Oste; French Co-prince: Christian Frémont
- Preceded by: Jaume Bartumeu
- Succeeded by: Antoni Martí

Minister of Economy and Finance
- In office 8 June 2009 – 28 April 2011
- Prime Minister: Jaume Bartumeu
- Preceded by: Joel Font Coma as Minister of Economy
- Succeeded by: Jordi Cinca Mateos

Personal details
- Born: 13 October 1971 (age 54) Andorra la Vella, Andorra
- Party: Social Democratic Party
- Education: University of Barcelona

Pere López Agràs (born 13 October 1971) is an Andorran politician and member of the Social Democratic Party. He served as acting prime minister of Andorra from April 28, 2011, until May 12, 2011.

Political offices
Preceded by Jaume Bartumeu	Prime Minister of Andorra; Acting; 2011	Succeeded by Antoni Martí
