= Concord (political party) =

Concord Concòrdia
- Leader: Cerni Escalé Cabré
- Co-presidents: Núria Segués; Sílvia Mosquera
- Founded: 6 July 2022
- Headquarters: C. Valls, 14, Andorra la Vella
- Ideology: Progressivism; Environmentalism
- Political position: Centre-left to left-wing
- European affiliation: Socialists, Democrats and Greens
- Colours: Teal; Red
- General Council: 5 / 28

Website
- concordia.ad

Concord (Catalan: Concòrdia) is an Andorran progressive political party formed in 2022 with the aim of standing in the 2023 parliamentary election. It proposes curbing foreign investment in the real estate sector and rationalizing housing prices, and has been critical of the association agreement with the European Union, demanding a new approach for the European single market and micro-states. They are also advocates for the preservation of natural heritage.

Concord is headed by two co-presidents, since 5 February 2024 they are Núria Segués and Sílvia Mosquera. At least one president must always not hold an elected position to separate the institutional influence of the party organization.

The new party won five seats in the 2023 Andorran parliamentary election in April.
