= 2023 Andorran parliamentary election =

- 2 April 2023
- All 28 seats in the General Council; 15 seats needed for a majority
Party	Leader	Vote %	Seats	+/–
DA+CC	Xavier Espot Zamora	32.66	16	+3
Concord	Cerni Escalé Cabré	21.43	5	New
PS+SDP	Pere López i Agràs	21.05	3	−4
Endavant	Carine Montaner Raynaud	16.00	3	New
Acció	Judith Pallarés i Cortés	4.20	1	New
This lists parties that won seats. See the complete results below.
Results by parish
Prime Minister before	Prime Minister after
Xavier Espot Zamora; DA	Xavier Espot Zamora; DA

Parliamentary elections were held in Andorra on 2 April 2023. The ruling liberal-conservative coalition of the Democrats for Andorra (DA) and Committed Citizens (CC) led by Prime Minister Xavier Espot won an absolute majority of seats, the fourth consecutive election victory for the DA. A new party, Concord, emerged in second place, taking the opposition leadership previously held by the Social Democratic Party, which fell to third place by losing four seats.

== Background ==
Three parties eventually formed a governing coalition after the 2019 Andorran parliamentary election, composed of the Democrats, the Liberal Party and Committed Citizens with Xavier Espot as prime minister.

On 14 June 2022, the minister of social affairs Judit Pallarés left the Liberal Party. However, the party assured that this internal crisis would not jeopardize the stability of the coalition. Prime Minister Espot announced, the following day, that he had no intention of advancing the parliamentary elections. Prime Minister Espot ordinarily dissolved the Consell General by decree on 6 February 2023. Campaigning started on 19 March at 3:00 pm. 1 April was the day of election silence and 2 April was the day of the election.

== Electoral system ==
Twenty-eight general councillors (Catalan: consellers generals) are elected, based on closed party lists:

- Fourteen general councillors representing the seven parishes (two councillors per parish) are elected from the list with most votes in each parish.
- Fourteen general councillors are elected from national lists using the largest remainder method of proportional representation.

The parish lists and the national list are independent of one another: the same person cannot appear on both the national list and on a parish list, and voters cast two separate ballots. There is no requirement to vote for the same party for both lists.

The 1993 Constitution limits the number of full terms served by a prime minister to two.

== Parties and alliances ==
The deadline for submitting candidacies ended on 13 February, so a total of six candidacies were defined, one less than in the 2019 parliamentary elections.

Three new political parties were presented:

- Concord: was constituted on 24 November 2022 and elected Cerni Escaldé as the national candidate.
- Andorra Forward: was formalized in November 2021 by Carine Montaner, a deputy who left the Third Way party in March that year but kept her seat.
- Action for Andorra: was founded by the minister of social affairs, Judith Pallarés and formalized as a party in October 2022. On 14 June of that year, Pallarés and four other deputies left the Liberals of Andorra party, alleging loss of comfort with the new more conservative postulates represented by the new party leader Josep Maria Cabanes.

The extraordinary congress of the Democrats for Andorra (DA) held on 15 November 2022 elected Xavier Espot to stand for re-election as prime minister.

On 1 February 2023, the Social Democratic Party (PS) and the Social Democracy and Progress (SDP) presented their coalition "social-democratic alliance" to run together in the elections, since "the moment calls for it". They confirmed that the PS leader, Pere López, would be the leader of the candidacy.

Political coalition Third Way and Lauredian Union (UL), who had two seats on the General Council, announced on 12 February 2023, that they would not run in the elections "based on the coherence and integrity of our political positions".

Liberals of Andorra presented its candidacies on 12 February 2023 with its leader Josep Maria Cabanes as candidate for prime minister.

=== National constituency ===
The candidacies presented in the national constituency, in which 14 councilors are elected by proportional representation, are:

List	Parties	Ideology	List leader	2019 result		
List	Parties	Ideology	List leader	PR votes	Const. votes	Seats
DA+CC	Democrats for Andorra	Liberal conservatism Euroscepticism	Xavier Espot Zamora	35.13%	34.86%	11 / 28
DA+CC	Committed Citizens	Social liberalism Localism; Euroscepticism	Xavier Espot Zamora	DNP	6.68%	2 / 28
PS+SDP	Social Democratic Party	Social democracy Pro-Europeanism	Pere López i Agràs	30.62%		7 / 28
PS+SDP	Social Democracy and Progress	Social democracy Pro-Europeanism	Pere López i Agràs	5.87%		0 / 28
Liberals of Andorra		Conservative liberalism Pro-Europeanism	Josep Maria Cabanes	12.48%	38.05%	4 / 28
Concord		Progressivism; Environmentalism	Cerni Escalé Cabré	New		
Andorra Forward		Right-wing populism Euroscepticism	Carine Montaner Raynaud	New		
Action for Andorra		Social liberalism Progressivism; Pro-Europeanism	Judith Pallarés i Cortés	New		

=== Parish constituencies ===
The parties or coalitions that are presented in the seven parish constituencies, in which the two candidates from the list with the most votes in each parish are elected, are:

Candidacy	Candidates						
Candidacy	Canillo	Encamp	Ordino	la Massana	Andorra la Vella	St. Julià de Lòria	les Escaldes
Committed Citizens				Carles Naudi; David Montané			
Democrats for Andorra	Guillem Casal; Jordi Jordana	Jordi Torres; Maria Martisella	Berna Coma; Alexandra Codina	Carles Naudi; David Montané	Conxita Marsol; Alain Cabanes	Helena Mas; Eva París	Trini Marín; Marc Magallón (Note: In coalition with Action for Andorra)
Liberals of Andorra			Berna Coma; Alexandra Codina		Conxita Marsol; Alain Cabanes	Helena Mas; Eva París	
Action for Andorra				Josep Fusté; Rebeca Roger			Trini Marín; Marc Magallón (Note: In coalition with DA)
PS+SDP		Marta Pujol; Susagna Venable (Note: In coalition with Agrupament Encampadà)	Joan Miquel Armengol; Pere Mas	Miquel Moliné; Francesc Lizama	Joaquim Miró; Marian Sanchiz	Gerard Alís; Josep Roig	David Pérez; Elisabet Zoppetti
Concord					Martí Alay; Miquel Clua	Pol Bartolomé; Maria Àngela Aché	Ramon Tena; Lara de Miguel
Andorra Forward			Jordina Bringué; Eva Font		Elisa Muxella; Dídac Tomàs	Bianca Martínez; Marc Ferreiro	

== Campaign ==
Prime Minister Xavier Espot dissolved the Consell General by decree on 6 February 2023, marking the start of campaigning on 19 March at 3:00 pm, 1 April as the day of election silence and 2 April as the election day.

Between 17 and 18 February, a delegation from the OSCE's Office for Democratic Institutions and Human Rights visited the country to assess the electoral process, issuing a report in which they expressed confidence in the Andorran electoral process and the election administration, so that an election observation was not necessary on 2 April.

Two days before the beginning of the electoral campaign, Democrats for Andorra presented their electoral program, an act that was criticized by PS+SDP as irregular.

The campaign began on 19 March with the traditional pasting of electoral posters. The Liberals of Andorra were the only party that did not start it in Andorra la Vella; they started in Sant Julià de Lòria instead.

The real estate boom, the association agreement with the European Union and the loss of purchasing power due to inflation were the key issues of the campaign.

On 29 March, anonymous pamphlets were disseminated, both on paper and digitally, accusing Espot and his family of benefiting from the Andorran government's intervention in Banca Privada d'Andorra in 2015, a bank accused by the United States Department of the Treasury of money laundering. The pamphlets also accused Democrats for Andorra of wanting to destroy the natural heritage with real estate speculation, denounced Attorney General Alfonso Alberca and his position on abortion, among others. Espot, the following day, released a video in which he denied these accusations, announced that from 3 April he would take legal actions for slander and defended the "honorability" of the country.

The debates between the national candidates took place on 20 March, organized by the Andorran Business Confederation (CEA); on 21 March, organized by Spanish Cadena SER and between Xavier Espot and opposition leader Pere López; and on 30 March, organized by Ràdio i Televisió d'Andorra.

=== Party slogans ===
Party or alliance	Original slogan	English translation	Ref.
DA+CC	Confiança	Trust	
L'A	#Cabanes2023; Primer, Andorra	#Cabanes2023; First, Andorra	
Acció	La clau de futur. Passa a l'ACCIÓ. Vota'ns!	The key to the future. Go to ACTION. Vote for us!	
PS+SDP	El canvi de la majoria	The change of the majority	
Concord	Batega x Andorra	Beat for Andorra	
Andorra Forward	El coratge del canvi	The courage of change	

== Opinion polls ==
Polling firm	Fieldwork date	Sample size	DA	CC	PS	SDP	L'A	TV– UL	Endavant	Concord	Acció	Others	Lead
ARI	21 Feb – 9 Mar 2023	810	41.9		23.4		6.0	DNP	14.9	11.3	2.4	—N/a	18.5
2019 election	7 Apr 2019	–	35.13	Const.	30.62	5.87	12.48	10.42	Did not exist			5.48	4.51

== Conduct ==
The eight electoral colleges were installed in the headquarters of the parishes, one for each parish added to the own polling station in the village of El Pas de la Casa. Election day began at 9:00 am without any incident and 29,958 people were called to vote, 9,010 of whom had already done so with a judicial vote (early voting that is done at the headquarters of the Andorran judiciary). Polls closed at 7:00 pm.

== Results ==
On the evening of 2 April, the Andorran government announced the results: the ruling coalition of Democrats for Andorra (DA) and Committed Citizens (CC) won the elections with 16 seats, gaining 3 more seats and the absolute majority of Consell General's seats. It was followed by the new Concord party, which won 5 seats. The third place was won by the progressive coalition formed by the Social Democratic Party (PS) and Social Democracy and Progress (SDP), which lost 4 seats, remaining with 3. In last positions, the new parties Andorra Forward, which won 3 seats, and Action for Andorra (Acció), which won one. At a press conference, Xavier Espot, accompanied by the Minister of Finance and acting government spokesman Cesar Marquina, proclaimed these results. Liberals of Andorra was left without parliamentary representation, losing the 4 seats it had.

The turnout was 66.95%, 1.3% less than that recorded in the 2019 elections, despite being higher than in previous years. Early voting rose to 30%, the highest figure ever recorded.

Graph of the party split among 28 seats.
Party or alliance		PR			Constituency			Total seats	+/–
Party or alliance		Votes	%	Seats	Votes	%	Seats	Total seats	+/–
Government alliance	Democrats for Andorra	6,262	32.66	4	7,835	43.63	10	14	+3
Government alliance	Committed Citizens	6,262	32.66	1	7,835	43.63	1	2	–
Government alliance	Liberals of Andorra	893	4.66	0	7,835	43.63	0	0	–4
Government alliance	Action for Andorra	805	4.20	0	7,835	43.63	1	1	New
Concord		4,109	21.43	3	3,516	19.58	2	5	New
Center-left alliance	Social Democratic Party	4,036	21.05	3	5,238	29.17	0	3	–4
Center-left alliance	Social Democracy and Progress	4,036	21.05	0	5,238	29.17	0	0	–
Andorra Forward		3,067	16.00	3	1,370	7.63	0	3	New
Total		19,172	100.00	14	17,959	100.00	14	28	0
Valid votes		19,172	95.62		17,959	89.60			
Invalid votes		341	1.70		557	2.78			
Blank votes		537	2.68		1,527	7.62			
Total votes		20,050	100.00		20,043	100.00			
Registered voters/turnout		29,958	66.93		29,958	66.90			
Source: Eleccions.ad, Lists

=== By parish ===
==== Summary ====
Parish	Committed Citizens	Democrats for Andorra	Action for Andorra	Concord (political party)	Social Democratic Party (Andorra)	AE	Part.
Canillo		100					71,97
Encamp		53,07			46,93		64,52
Ordino		43,40			39,17	17,43	76,24
La Massana	47,72		24,73		27,55		71,40
Andorra la Vella		32,77		23,13	29,56	14,54	62,10
Sant Julià de Lòria		26,83		40,06	19,07	14,04	67,56
Escaldes-Engordany		40,42		33,69	25,90		68,59
Source: Eleccions d'Andorra

==== Andorra la Vella ====
Party	Votes	%
DA–Liberals of Andorra	1,665	32.77
PS–SDP	1,502	29.56
Concord	1,175	23.13
Andorra Forward	739	14.54
Total	5,081	100.00
Valid votes	5,081	94.18
Invalid votes	89	1.65
Blank votes	225	4.17
Total votes	5,395	100.00
Registered voters/turnout	8,693	62.06
Source: Eleccions.ad

==== Canillo ====
Party	Votes	%
DA–Liberals of Andorra	530	100.00
Total	530	100.00
Valid votes	530	61.41
Invalid votes	46	5.33
Blank votes	287	33.26
Total votes	863	100.00
Registered voters/turnout	1,199	71.98
Source: Eleccions.ad

==== Escaldes–Engordany ====
Party	Votes	%
DA–Liberals of Andorra	1,453	40.42
Concord	1,211	33.69
PS–SDP	931	25.90
Total	3,595	100.00
Valid votes	3,595	89.38
Invalid votes	134	3.33
Blank votes	293	7.28
Total votes	4,022	100.00
Registered voters/turnout	5,863	68.60
Source: Eleccions.ad

==== Encamp ====
Party	Votes	%
DA–Liberals of Andorra	1,304	53.07
PS–SDP	1,153	46.93
Total	2,457	100.00
Valid votes	2,457	87.72
Invalid votes	106	3.78
Blank votes	238	8.50
Total votes	2,801	100.00
Registered voters/turnout	4,341	64.52
Source: Eleccions.ad

==== La Massana ====
Party	Votes	%
Committed Citizens-DA	1,015	47.72
PS–SDP	586	27.55
Action for Andorra	526	24.73
Total	2,127	100.00
Valid votes	2,127	85.52
Invalid votes	92	3.70
Blank votes	268	10.78
Total votes	2,487	100.00
Registered voters/turnout	3,483	71.40
Source: Eleccions.ad

==== Ordino ====
Party	Votes	%
Action for Andorra	585	43.40
PS–SDP	528	39.17
Andorra Forward	235	17.43
Total	1,348	100.00
Valid votes	1,348	92.90
Invalid votes	24	1.65
Blank votes	79	5.44
Total votes	1,451	100.00
Registered voters/turnout	1,903	76.25
Source: Eleccions.ad

==== Sant Julià de Lòria ====
Party	Votes	%
Concord	1,130	40.06
DA–Liberals of Andorra	757	26.83
PS–SDP	538	19.07
Andorra Forward	396	14.04
Total	2,821	100.00
Valid votes	2,821	93.29
Invalid votes	66	2.18
Blank votes	137	4.53
Total votes	3,024	100.00
Registered voters/turnout	4,476	67.56
Source: Eleccions.ad

== Reactions ==
After winning the elections, Prime Minister Xavier Espot assured the citizens that "we will not fail you and during these 4 years; I will work tirelessly to be worthy of this trust and to bring Andorra to a good place". He also congratulated the two new political forces that obtained a good result, Concord and Andorra Forward, to whom he offered to work together to "work for the benefit of the citizens".

The leader of Concord, Cerni Escalé, announced that they would carry out a "constructive opposition, but courageous and close to the citizens", and expressed his satisfaction with the result obtained, a better result than the polls predicted.

The leader of the PS–SDP coalition, Pere López, acknowledged the poor results and announced that it is necessary to open a process of reflection within the formation and that, at that time, he did not intend to make a decision on his leadership at the head of the PS. On 5 April, López announced that he was stepping down from his seat and the party presidency at the party congress on 20 May.

Carine Montaner, the Andorra Forward candidate, was positive about the result that brought the party to fourth place, and stated that the party will now dedicate itself to "doing the work of counterpower, which is fundamental to fighting corruption and the cronyism that has predominated these past legislatures". Montaner also stated that the numbers did not "add up", insinuating her suspicion that there was electoral fraud, which was criticized by Xavier Espot.

Judith Pallarés, national candidate for Action for Andorra, admitted that she was "a bit sad" about the result obtained and, despite wanting to make a positive reading, expressed the need to reflect internally.

Xavier Espot was sworn in for another term as prime minister on 17 May 2023.
