= Action for Andorra =

Social liberal party in Andorra

Action for Andorra Acció per Andorra
- Abbreviation: ACC!Ó
- Leader: Judith Pallarés i Cortés
- Founder: Judith Pallarés i Cortés
- Founded: October 2022
- Split from: Liberals of Andorra
- Headquarters: Carrer de les Canals, 5 1r 1a, AD500, Andorra la Vella
- Ideology: Social liberalism Pro-Europeanism; Social progressivism
- Political position: Centre to centre-left
- European affiliation: Alliance of Liberals and Democrats for Europe
- Colours: Aquamarine; Navy blue
- General Council: 1 / 28

Website
- somaccio.org

Action for Andorra (Catalan: Acció per Andorra), often shortened to Action (Acció, styled as ACC!Ó), is a social liberal party in Andorra founded in September 2022 as a split from the Liberals of Andorra.

== History ==
The party was created after the four councillors in the General Council of the Liberals of Andorra – Ferran Costa, Marc Magallon, Silvia Ferrer and Eva López – together with Minister Judith Pallarés announced that they had left the party on 14 June 2022. Pallarés claimed that they left the party due to disagreements with a conservative turn inside the Liberals, while she and the councillors preferred a social liberal project. They continued to remain in the government and give it support.

== Election results ==
=== General Council elections ===
Election	Leader	Votes	%	Seats	+/–	Position	Government
2023	Judith Pallarés i Cortés	805	4.20	1 / 28	Steady	6th	Opposition
