= Committed Citizens =

Committed Citizens Ciutadans Compromesos
- Abbreviation: CC
- President: Josep Maria Garrallà
- Founder: Carles Naudi
- Founded: December 2011
- Headquarters: 30 Av. de Sant Antoni, La Massana
- Ideology: Social liberalism La Massana localism Environmentalism
- Political position: Centre to centre-left
- Colours: Purple; Orange
- General Council: 3 / 28
- Mayors: 1 / 7
- Municipal councils: 12 / 80

Website
- www.ciutadanscompromesos.com

The Committed Citizens (Catalan: Ciutadans Compromesos; CC) is a social liberal Andorran political party founded in 2011 for the municipal elections in La Massana.

== History ==
The party's first election was the municipal election in La Massana. CC obtained almost 50% of the votes in the ballot, ahead of the 3 other lists and obtained 9 of the 12 advisers. In 2015 the political movement took part again in the poll and obtained 11 of the 12 advisers.

In 2019, the political party decided to stand for national elections. They presented their candidacy for the 2019 parliamentary election, and obtained two seats in the General Council, Carles Naudi d´Areny and Raul Ferré Bonet. They were part of the coalition government led by the Democrats for Andorra.

For the municipal elections of December 2019, the movement ran only in La Massana and formed a coalition with the Democrats and the Liberals. The coalition was the only option on the ballot in the parish and obtained all of the seats.

== Electoral results ==
=== Legislative elections ===
Year	Leader	Seats	+/–	Position	Government
2019	David Baró Riba	2 / 28	New	5th	Coalition
2023	Josep Maria Garrallà	2 / 28	Steady	5th	Coalition

=== Municipal elections ===
Year	Votes	%	Seats
2011	779		9 / 80
2015	1330	9,94	11 / 80
2019 (Note: Alliance avec les Démocrates et les Libéraux dans la seul commune où les Citoyens engagés sont engagés)	912		12 / 80
