= Constitution of Andorra =

Supreme law of the Principality of Andorra

The Constitution of Andorra (Catalan: Constitució d'Andorra) is the supreme law of the Principality of Andorra. It was adopted on 2 February 1993 and given assent by the Andorran people in a referendum on 14 March 1993. According to the Constitution itself, it was to enter into force on the day of its publication in the Butlletí Oficial del Principat d'Andorra, which occurred on 28 April 1993.

The Constitution was signed by Andorra's two co-princes: the President of France and the Bishop of Urgell, who at that time were François Mitterrand and Joan Martí Alanis respectively. The new constitution stipulates that these two officials are Andorra's heads of state. Indeed, this arrangement has existed for centuries, although at one time, the French king or emperor held the position now held by the French president.

== Contents ==
=== Preamble ===
The Andorran Constitution's preamble reads:

The Andorran People, in their full freedom and independence, and in the exercise of their own sovereignty,

Aware of the need to adapt Andorra's Institutions to the new situation arising from the evolution of its geographical, historical, and sociocultural environment, as well as the need, in this new legal framework, to organise the relationships that institutions whose origins are in the pareatges will have to maintain,

Convinced of the usefulness of obtaining any likely mechanisms of guaranteeing legal security in the exercise of basic individual rights, which, even if they have always been present in Andorran society and respected thereby, were not the object of true regulation,

Having decided to persevere in furthering such values as freedom, justice, democracy and social progress, and to uphold and strengthen Andorra's harmonious relations with the rest of the world, especially with the countries that are its neighbours, on the basis of mutual respect, coexistence, and peace,

Being determined to bring their contribution and support to all mankind's common causes, particularly to preserve Earth's integrity and guarantee future generations an adequate environment,

Wishing for the motto "Virtus, Unita, Fortior", which has presided over Andorra's peaceful advancement for more than seven hundred years of history, to stay fully alive and always to inspire Andorrans in their deeds,

Sovereignly approve this present Constitution.

=== Andorran sovereignty ===
Article 1 of the Andorran Constitution lays out the form that the State takes, namely the diarchy with the Bishop of Urgell and the President of France as joint heads of state. It also states the country's official name: Principat d'Andorra. It furthermore states that Andorra's sovereignty lies with its people. It ends by listing Andorra's parishes.

Article 2 states that Andorra's official language is Catalan, and that its national anthem, flag, and coat of arms are "those which tradition has given it". It also says that Andorra la Vella is the country's capital.

Article 3 declares the Constitution to be the supreme Andorran legal standard. It bans arbitrary punishment and recognises the principles of international law. It furthermore says that any international treaties or accords concluded by Andorra are to be incorporated into the country's laws, and may not be modified or abrogated by any law.

=== Rights and freedoms ===
Articles 4 to 36 of the Constitution lay out Andorrans' rights and freedoms.

Article 4 recognises the intangibility of human dignity, and therefore guarantees certain inviolable and imprescriptible rights.

Article 5 declares that the Universal Declaration of Human Rights is integrated into the country's legal system.

Article 6 declares that all persons are equal before the law, and that it is up to the "public powers" to create conditions that make individuals' equality and freedom real and effective.

Article 7 governs Andorran nationality. Andorrans risk losing their citizenship if they are also nationals of another country.

Article 8 recognises the right to life at all stages and protection thereof, forbids torture and other cruel, inhuman or degrading punishments, and explicitly forbids the death penalty.

Article 9 covers loss of freedom due to police and judicial action. It explicitly limits the period of police custody to forty-eight hours, after which the accused must be presented to a court.

Article 10 lays out a citizen's rights before the courts, specifically, the right to obtain a decision from the court that is firmly based in law, the right to have a lawyer in court, and the right to have free legal representation in cases where this is necessary.

Article 11 covers freedom of religion, and says that it is an Andorran's right not to declare his religion if he does not want to. On the other hand, there are actually limits placed on the declaration of one's religion in cases where this would threaten public security or violate others' rights. The Roman Catholic Church is also accorded an explicit guarantee to be able to function freely and publicly, and to maintain its special relations with the state "in keeping with Andorran tradition".

Article 12 guarantees freedom of expression, and even freedom to keep professional secrets. Also, censorship and any other means of ideological control by the authorities are forbidden.

Articles 13, 14, and 15 cover marriage, spouses' rights in relation to each other, children's rights in relation to their families, the right to privacy, and the inviolability of an Andorran's home.

Articles 16 and 17 recognise Andorrans' rights to participate in peaceful demonstrations, as long as the authorities are notified beforehand, and to associate freely.

Article 18 states that Andorrans have the right to form professional or trade organisations, as long as they are Andorran in character (i.e., not controlled from abroad) and democratic in nature.

Article 19 gives workers and business owners the right to protect their economic and social interests.

Article 20 covers education. This is guaranteed all Andorrans, and moreover, parents have the right to choose what kind of education that their children will have, in keeping with their own religious convictions.

Article 21 covers movement within Andorra, and exit from and entry to the national territory. Also, it gives Andorrans, and established foreign nationals, the right to make their home in Andorra.

Article 22 lays out foreigners' rights in cases of non-renewal of residency or expulsion order. It says that this can only be done as prescribed by law, and that the foreigner in such a case has recourse to the courts.

Article 23 gives everyone the right to submit a petition to the "public powers".

Articles 24, 25, and 26 spell out Andorrans' political rights, namely the franchise, the right to access to public institutions, and the right to form political parties as long as their activities are legal and they are democratic in nature.

Articles 27 to 36 cover "economic, social, and cultural rights and principles". As might be expected, it forbids Andorrans to be deprived of their property without due process, and it also recognises the right to enterprise in the framework of a market economy. It furthermore also recognises work as every Andorran's right. Also, the State must ensure a system of social security, as well as watch over the wise use of land and natural resources so as to preserve the natural environment for future generations. The State guarantees the conservation and development of Andorran heritage, as well as access thereto.

=== Andorrans' obligations ===
Article 37 provides for a fair taxation system. Everyone is supposed to pay whatever their means allow them to pay.

Article 38 allows the State to institute by law forms of "national civic service" in the general interest.

=== Guarantees of rights and freedoms ===
Articles 39 to 42 lay out exactly how the aforesaid rights are to be guaranteed in Andorran society. The "public powers'" ability to override these rights is forbidden in some cases, and restricted to changes in government legislation in others. It does also mention, however, that certain rights may be limited in cases of national emergency, such as those brought about by natural disasters or political upheavals, such as war.

=== The co-princes, the General Council, and the government ===
Articles 43 to 49 lay out the function of Andorra's two co-princes, the Bishop of Urgell and the President of France.

Articles 50 to 71 relate to the structure and function of the General Council of the Valleys, Andorra's legislative body.

Articles 72 to 78 relate to the government as a whole. For more information on these, see Politics of Andorra.

=== Territorial organisation ===
Articles 79 to 84 lay out the function of the communes within Andorra as representatives of the parishes. These are responsible for certain local functions, according to Andorra's Constitution. See Parishes of Andorra.

=== Justice and the Constitutional Tribunal ===
Articles 85 to 94 lay out the structure of Andorra's court system. The Judiciary must be independent. Judges serve six-year, renewable terms, and are elected by those with law degrees.

Articles 95 to 104 deal with the Constitutional Tribunal, which is the supreme authority for interpreting the Constitution, and whose decisions are binding on the "public powers" as well as on private individuals.

=== Constitutional amendment ===
Unlike some constitutions (the Constitution of Canada, for example), the amendment procedures for Andorra's Constitution, laid out therein, are quite straightforward.

Article 105 says that the initiative for constitutional change may come from the co-princes, jointly, or from one-third of the members of the General Council.

Article 106 requires a two-thirds majority in favour in the General Council for an amendment to be adopted. It must then forthwith be put to a referendum for ratification.

Article 107 requires the ministerial formality of the co-princes' sanction of the new amendment once the requirements of Article 106 have been satisfied (they have no power to overturn an amendment).

== Sources ==
- Text of Andorra's Constitution (in Catalan)
