= 2026 in Andorra =

- Decades: 2000s; 2010s; 2020s
- See also: History of Andorra; List of years in Andorra

Events in the year 2026 in Andorra.

== Incumbents ==
- Co-Princes: Emmanuel Macron and Josep-Lluís Serrano Pentinat
- Prime Minister: Xavier Espot Zamora

== Events ==
- Andorra at the 2026 Winter Olympics

== Holidays ==
- 1 January – New Year's Day
- 6 January – Epiphany
- 3 March – Carnival
- 14 March – Constitution Day
- 3 April – Good Friday
- 6 April – Easter Monday
- 1 May – International Workers' Day
- 25 May – Whit Monday
- 15 August – Assumption Day
- 8 September – National Day
- 1 November – All Saints' Day
- 8 December – Immaculate Conception
- 25 December – Christmas Day
- 26 December – Saint Stephen's Day

== Deaths ==
- 11 January – Miquel Naudí, 77, politician, member of the General Council (1981–1983).
- 20 January – Maria Pilar Riba Font, 81, politician, member of the General Council (2005–2011).
- 27 January – Joan Pujal Areny, politician and businessman, mayor of Sant Julià de Lòria (1982–1983, 2000–2003) and member of the General Council (1992–1993).
- 31 March – Sergi Mas Balaguer, 95, Spanish-born sculptor and cultural activist.
- 17 April – Avelina Besolí Bacó, 106, centenarian, country's oldest woman.
