= 2021 in Andorra =

- Decades: 2000s; 2010s; 2020s
- See also: History of Andorra; List of years in Andorra

Events in the year 2021 in Andorra.

== Incumbents ==
- Co-Princes: Emmanuel Macron and Joan Enric Vives Sicília
- Prime Minister: Xavier Espot Zamora

== Events ==
Ongoing — COVID-19 pandemic in Andorra

== Deaths ==
- 24 January – Antoni Puigdellívol, businessman and politician (born 1946).
- 31 March – Climent Palmitjavila, politician, member of the General Council (born 1940).
