= 2020 in Andorra =

- Decades: 2000s; 2010s; 2020s
- See also: History of Andorra; List of years in Andorra

Events in the year 2020 in the Principality of Andorra.

== Incumbents ==
- Co-Princes: Emmanuel Macron and Joan Enric Vives Sicília
- Prime Minister: Xavier Espot Zamora

== Events ==
Ongoing – COVID-19 pandemic in Andorra

- 24 July – 9 August – Andorra was scheduled to compete at the 2020 Summer Olympics in Tokyo, having qualified in women's K1 canoe slalom.

== Deaths ==
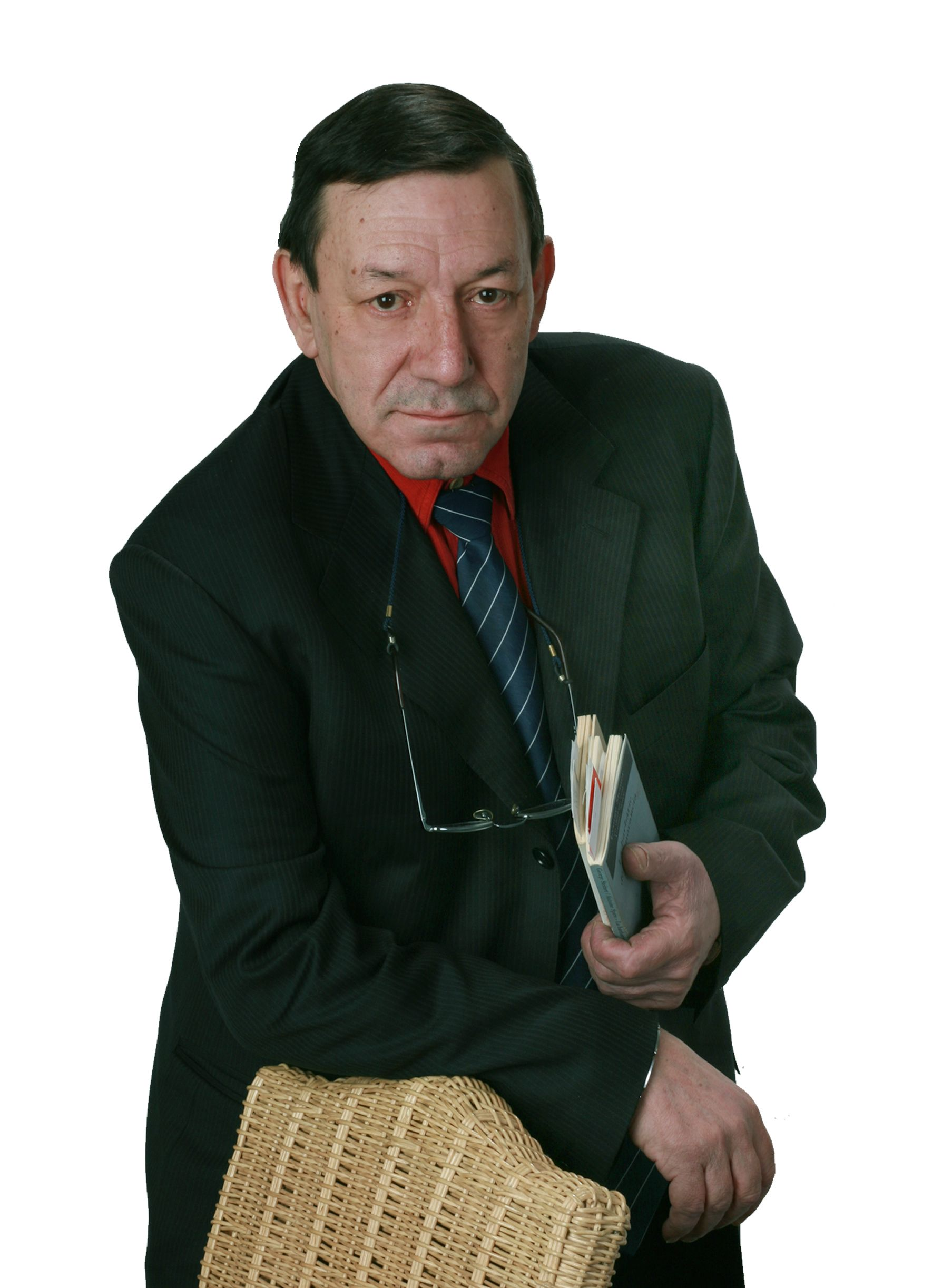
Antoni Morell Mora

- 5 January – Antoni Morell Mora, diplomat, civil servant, writer and lawyer (b. 1941).
- 16 February – Joan Armengol, attorney and politician (b. 1922/1923).
- 14 August – Francesc Badia Batalla, civil servant and magistrate, Episcopal Veguer (b. 1923).
