= 2027 in Andorra =

- Decades: 2000s; 2010s; 2020s
- See also: History of Andorra; List of years in Andorra

Events in the year 2027 in Andorra.

== Events ==
=== Predicted and scheduled ===
- April – 2027 Andorran parliamentary election
- 2 August – Solar eclipse of August 2, 2027 (partial eclipse)

== Holidays ==
- 1 January – New Year's Day
- 6 January – Epiphany
- 8 February – Carnival
- 14 March – Constitution Day
- 26 March – Good Friday
- 29 March – Easter Monday
- 1 May – International Workers' Day
- 17 May – Whit Monday
- 15 August – Assumption Day
- 8 September – National Day
- 1 November – All Saints' Day
- 8 December – Immaculate Conception
- 25 December – Christmas Day
- 26 December – Saint Stephen's Day
