= 2022 in Andorra =

- Decades: 2000s; 2010s; 2020s
- See also: History of Andorra; List of years in Andorra

Events in the year 2022 in Andorra.

== Incumbents ==
- Co-Princes: Emmanuel Macron and Joan Enric Vives Sicília
- Prime Minister: Xavier Espot Zamora

== Events ==
Ongoing — COVID-19 pandemic in Andorra

- March 1 - Prime Minister Xavier Espot announces that he will enter urgently to parliamentary procedure on Wednesday so that the General Council can approve the normative framework to apply economic sanctions to Russia. This law will aim to freeze the bank assets of 700 people and 50 companies that the European Union considers to be linked to the invasion of Ukraine. It is the first time in the history of Andorra that sanctions have been applied to a foreign country.
- March 28 - The Andorran government announces the lifting of indoor mask usage, except in health care institutions, as well as the need for antigen testing for nightlife. The government also announces the relaxation of the protocol for positive contacts.
- June 7 - Prime Minister Xavier Espot tests positive for COVID-19.
- July 2 - Andorra reports its first case of monkeypox.
- July 21 - General Council of Andorra allowed bíll for same-sex marriage.
