= 2023 in Andorra =

- Decades: 2000s; 2010s; 2020s
- See also: History of Andorra; List of years in Andorra

Events in the year 2023 in Andorra.

== Incumbents ==
- Co-Princes: Emmanuel Macron and Joan Enric Vives Sicília
- Prime Minister: Xavier Espot Zamora

== Events ==
Ongoing — COVID-19 pandemic in Andorra

- February 17 – Same-sex marriage becomes legal in Andorra.
- April 2 – 2023 Andorran parliamentary election: Andorrans elect the 28 members of the parliament.

== Sports ==
- 2022–23 Primera Divisió
