= Areny =

Areny is a surname. Notable people with the surname include:

- Francesc Areny Casal, Andorran politician
- Guillem Areny (died 2020), Andorran politician
- Joan Carles Camp Areny, Andorran politician
- Joan Pujal Areny (1937–2026), Andorran politician and businessman
- Pere Areny (1913–1943), Andorran murderer
- Roser Bastida Areny, Andorran politician
- Xavier Areny (born 1957), Andorran alpine skier

== See also ==
- Arenys (disambiguation)
