= 2025 in Andorra =

- Decades: 2000s; 2010s; 2020s
- See also: History of Andorra; List of years in Andorra

Events in the year 2025 in Andorra.

== Incumbents ==
- Co-Princes: Emmanuel Macron and Joan Enric Vives Sicília (until 31 May); Josep-Lluís Serrano Pentinat (since 31 May)
- Prime Minister: Xavier Espot Zamora

== Events ==
- 28 April – A massive blackout hits the Iberian Peninsula, causing power outages in Andorra.
- 22 September – Andorra formally recognizes the State of Palestine effective once certain conditions are in place.

== Holidays ==
- 1 January – New Year's Day
- 6 January – Epiphany
- 3 March – Carnival
- 14 March – Constitution Day
- 18 April – Good Friday
- 21 April – Easter Monday
- 1 May – International Workers' Day
- 9 June – Whit Monday
- 15 August – Assumption Day
- 8 September – National Day
- 1 November – All Saints' Day
- 8 December – Immaculate Conception
- 25 December – Christmas Day
- 26 December – Saint Stephen's Day

== Deaths ==
- 1 May – Antoni Garrallà, politician and hotelier, mayor of La Massana (1995–2003) and deputy general syndic of the General Council (1985–1989).
- 15 July – Lluis Viu, 82, Andorran-Spanish Olympic skier (1964) and politician, mayor of Andorra la Vella (1992–1997).
- 12 December – Pere Font Moles, 99, politician, cultural activist and printing entrepreneur, member of the General Council (1964–1967, 1970–1973).
