= 2019 in Andorra =

- Decades: 1990s; 2000s; 2010s; 2020s
- See also: History of Andorra; List of years in Andorra

Events in the year 2019 in the Principality of Andorra.

== Incumbents ==
- Co-Princes: Emmanuel Macron and Joan Enric Vives Sicília
- Prime Minister: Antoni Martí (from 2015 until 16 May) Xavier Espot Zamora (since 16 May)

== Events ==
- 7 April – Parliamentary elections were held in Andorra for all 28 seats of the General Council.
