= 2024 in Andorra =

- Decades: 2000s; 2010s; 2020s
- See also: History of Andorra; List of years in Andorra

Events in the year 2024 in Andorra.

== Incumbents ==
- Co-Princes: Emmanuel Macron and Joan Enric Vives Sicília
- Prime Minister: Xavier Espot Zamora

== Events ==
=== January ===
- 1 January - The minimum wage increases by 7%, rising to €7.94 per hour (≈$8.53) and €1,376 per month (≈$1,479).
- Activist Vanessa Mendoza Cortés is acquitted of defamation charges related to her criticism of Andorra’s abortion ban before a United Nations committee in 2019.

=== May ===
- 30 May - The Council of the European Union authorizes the opening of negotiations for a separate agreement with Andorra to create a legal basis for the absence of border controls between Andorra and the Schengen Area.

=== July ===
- The Vatican appoints Bishop Josep-Lluís Serrano Pentinat as coadjutor of the Roman Catholic diocese of Urgell, set to succeed Bishop Joan Enric Vives i Sicília as one of Andorra’s co-princes.
- The Council of Europe’s GRECO releases a report noting Andorra’s implementation of a parliamentary code of conduct, while recommending greater measures against corruption among high-level officials and police.

=== August ===
- 19 August - The government passes a law on sustainable habitat and foreign investment, requiring biannual company reports and targeting shell companies.

=== Undated ===
- An interreligious dialogue group conducts talks with the Les Escaldes municipality on establishing a multireligious cemetery to address long-standing requests from Andorra’s Jewish and Muslim communities.

== Holidays ==
- 1 January - New Year's Day
- 6 January - Epiphany
- 12 February – Carnival
- 14 March - Constitution Day
- 29 March - Good Friday
- 1 April - Easter Monday
- 1 May - International Workers' Day
- 20 May - Whit Monday
- 15 August - Assumption Day
- 8 September - National Day
- 1 November - All Saints' Day
- 8 December - Immaculate Conception
- 25 December - Christmas Day
- 26 December – Saint Stephen's Day
