= List of years in Andorra =

This is a list of years in Andorra. For only articles about years in Andorra that have been written, see Category:Years in Andorra.

== 13th – 19th century ==
1200s · 1300s · 1400s · 1500s · 1600s · 1700s · 1800s

== 20th century ==
Decades: 1900s · 1910s · 1920s · 1930s · 1940s · 1950s · 1960s · 1970s · 1980s · 1990s

== 21st century ==
2000s
2000
2001
2002
2003
2004
2005
2006
2007
2008
2009

2010s
2010
2011
2012
2013
2014
2015
2016
2017
2018
2019

2020s
2020
2021
2022
2023
2024
2025
2026
