= Arnalda de Caboet =

Andorran feudal ruler

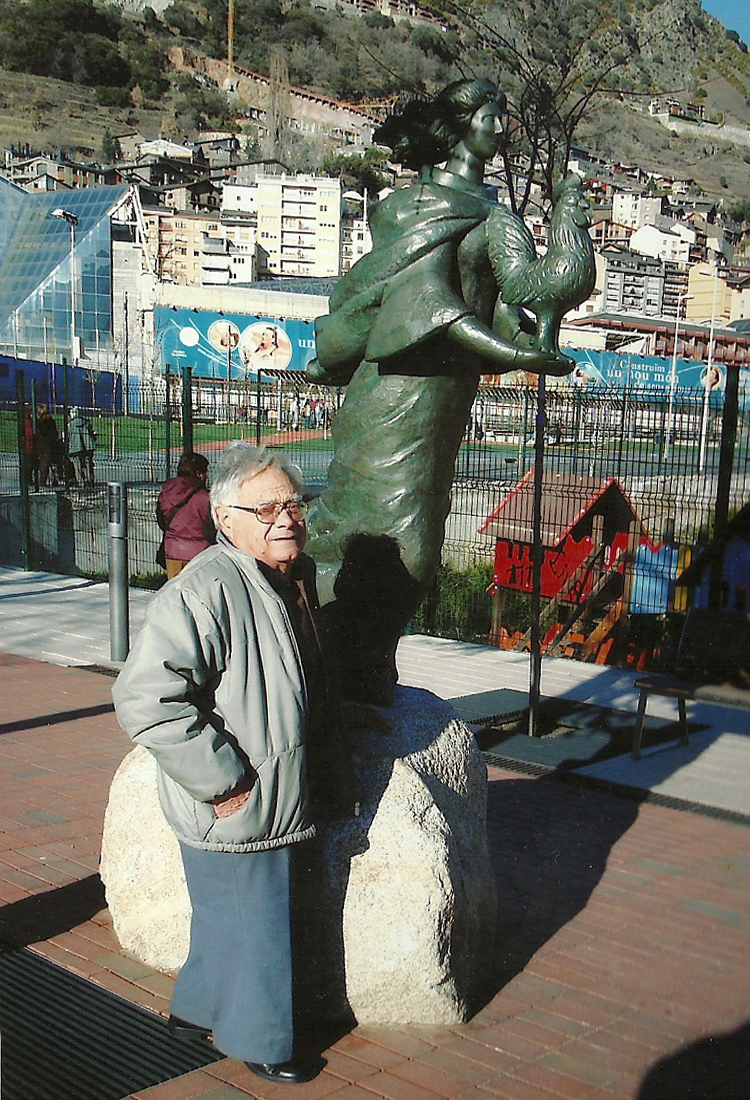
Sergi Mas with his work Arnaldeta de Caboet (Prat del Roure, Escaldes Engordany) in 2010

Arnalda de Caboet (1165–1202) was an Andorran feudal ruler. She was suo jure ruling Lady of Caboet (Cabó), Andorra and Sant Joan in Andorra in 1180–1199. She was born to Arnau de Caboet. She married Arnaud I of Castelbon and became the mother of Ermessenda de Castellbò. She is remembered because her second marriage and the marriage of her daughter set the stage for the creation of the co-principality of Andorra.

== Life ==
De Caboet was born in Lleida in Catalonia in 1165. She inherited the three valleys of Valls of Andorra from her father when he died, and is referred to as the first pubilla (female heiress) of the Valls of Andorra. Her father left her in the care of the Bishop of Urgell, who married her to Bertran de Tarascó and endowed her with the three valleys, but reserved her sovereignty. On Bertran's death, de Caboet remarried Arnau, the bishop of Castellbò, in 1180. When her son died in 1199, de Caboet ceded control of the three valleys to her husband.

In 1208 de Caboet’s daughter Ermessenda married Robert Bernat II of Foix, an act which brought together the three houses of Caboet, Castellbò and Foix. Arnalda de Caboet’s second marriage and that of her daughter are significant as they set the stage for the creation of the co-principality of Andorra.

== Legacy ==
A passage in Andorra is named for Arnalda. It is called the Arnaldeta de Caboet passage, and can be found in is located in Escaldes-Engordany, running from Prat del Roure to Avinguda Carlemany. There is a small statue of Arnalda de Caboet holding a rooster, situated in Escalda, which was created by Sergi Mas Balaguer in 2007.
