= Andorra–Israel relations =

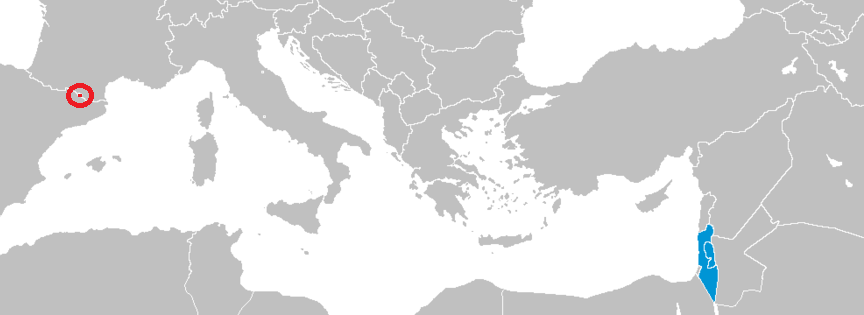
- Andorra: Israel

Andorra–Israel relations are foreign relations between Andorra and Israel.

Andorra does not have an embassy in Israel, and Israel does not have an embassy in Andorra. The Israeli embassy in Madrid also serves Andorra.

== History ==
Andorra and Israel established relations on 13 April 1994. Nationals of Andorra and Israel do not need a visa to visit one another.

In 2024, Andorra refused to recognize the Palestinian State like Spain as "the conditions are not met", as they believe that the Hamas is a terrorist organization and not considered an authority, whereas the Palestinian Authority has no de facto authority.

== Jews in Andorra ==
Jews started to immigrate to Andorra during the Second World War, and since 1998 official Jewish community was established. The community has one Synagogue. There are approximately 120 Jews in Andorra.

== See also ==
- History of the Jews in Andorra
- Foreign relations of Andorra
- Foreign relations of Israel
