= Visa requirements for Andorran citizens =

Administrative entry restrictions

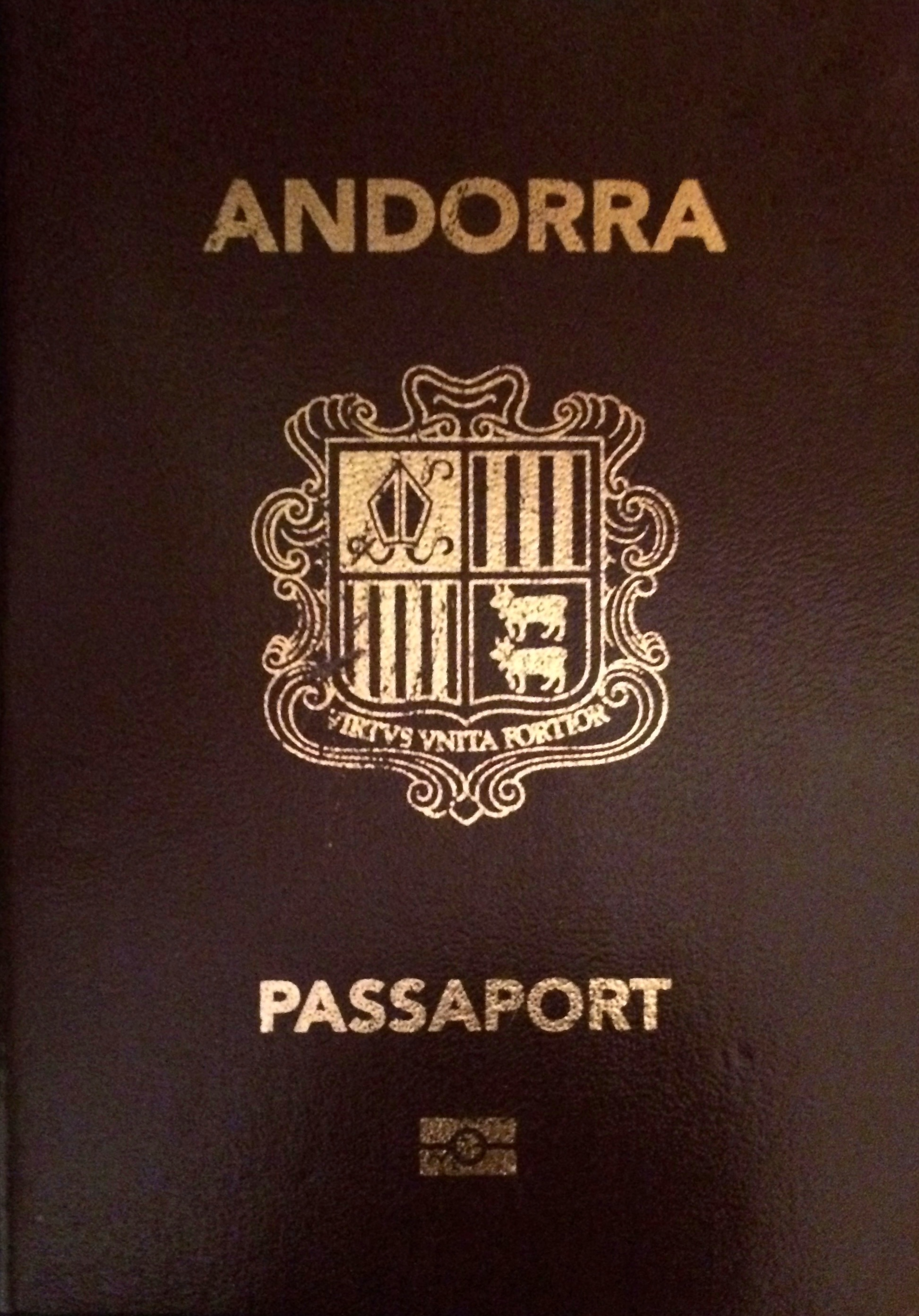
An Andorran passport

Visa requirements for Andorra citizens are administrative entry restrictions by the authorities of other states placed on citizens of Andorra. As 2026, Andorran citizens have visa-free or visa on arrival access to 169 countries and territories, ranking the Andorran passport 14th in terms of travel freedom according to the Henley Passport Index.

== Visa requirements map ==
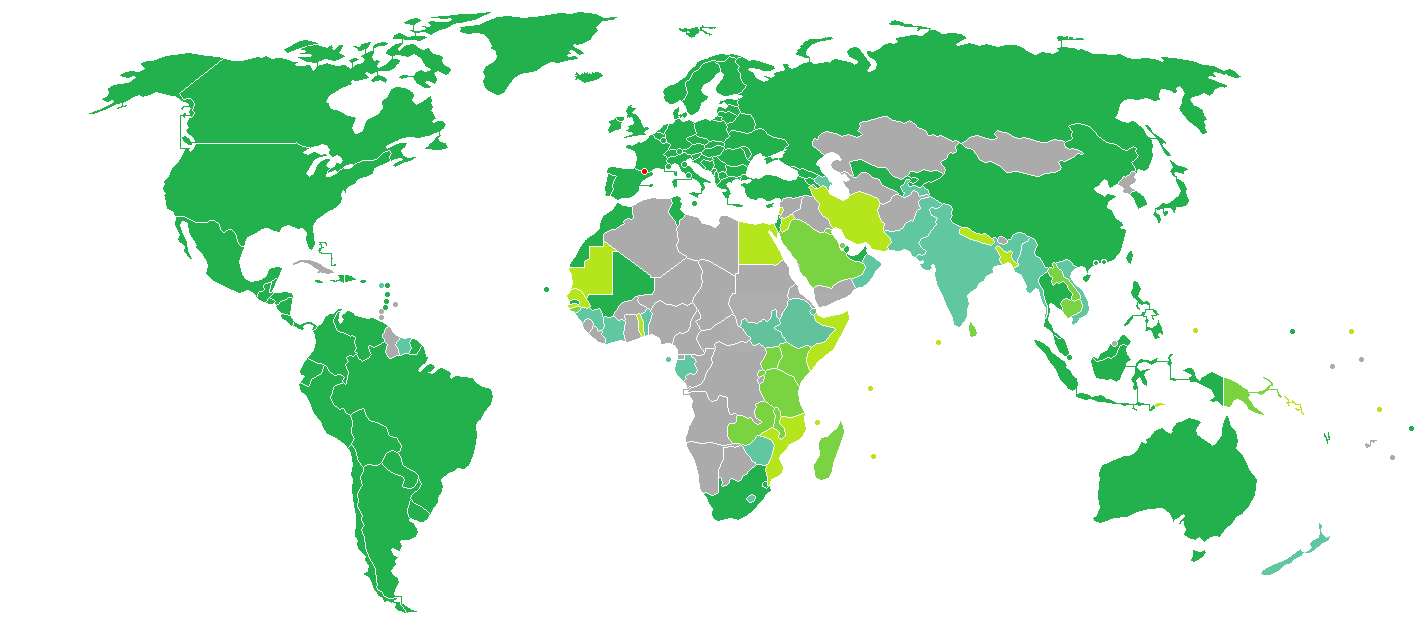
Visa requirements for Andorran citizens Andorra Visa free access Visa not required / ESTA / eTA / eVisitor eVisa Visa available both on arrival or online Visa required

== Visa requirements ==
| Country | Visa requirement | Allowed stay | Notes (excluding departure fees) |
|---|---|---|---|
| Afghanistan | eVisa | 30 days | e-Visa : Visitors must arrive at Kabul International (KBL). |
| Albania | Visa not required | 90 days | |
| Algeria | Visa required | | |
| Angola | Visa required | | |
| Antigua and Barbuda | Visa not required | | |
| Argentina | Visa not required | 90 days | |
| Armenia | Visa not required | 180 days | |
| Australia | eVisitor | 90 days | 90 days on each visit in 12-month period if granted |
| Austria | Visa not required | 90 days | 90 days within any 180 day period in the Schengen Area |
| Azerbaijan | eVisa | 30 days | |
| Bahamas | Visa not required | 8 months | |
| Bahrain | eVisa / Visa on arrival | 14 days | |
| Bangladesh | Visa on arrival | 30 days | |
| Barbados | Visa not required | 90 days | |
| Belarus | Visa not required | 30 days | Visa-free until 31 December 2025. |
| Belgium | Visa not required | 90 days | 90 days within any 180 day period in the Schengen Area |
| Belize | Visa not required | | |
| Benin | eVisa | 30 days | Must have an international vaccination certificate. |
| Bhutan | eVisa | 90 days | Visa fee is USD 40 per person and visa application may be processed within 5 business days with duration of stay of 90 days.; e-Visa applicant is also subject to pay Sustainable Development Fee |
| Bolivia | Visa not required | 90 days | |
| Bosnia and Herzegovina | Visa not required | 90 days | 90 days within any 6-month period |
| Botswana | eVisa | 3 months | |
| Brazil | Visa not required | 90 days | |
| Brunei | Visa required | | |
| Bulgaria | Visa not required | 90 days | 90 days within any 180 day period in the Schengen Area |
| Burkina Faso | eVisa | | |
| Burundi | eVisa / Visa on arrival | | Must hold an Entry Authorisation letter issued by the authorities of Burundi beforehand. |
| Cambodia | eVisa / Visa on arrival | 30 days | Visa is also obtainable online. |
| Cameroon | eVisa | | |
| Canada | eTA / Visa not required | 6 months | eTA required if arriving by air. |
| Cape Verde | Visa not required | 30 days | Requirement to register online 5 days before arrival |
| Central African Republic | Visa required | | |
| Chad | Visa required | | |
| Chile | Visa not required | 90 days | |
| China | Visa not required | 30 days | Visa-free from 8 November, 2024 to 31 December, 2026. |
| Colombia | Visa not required | 90 days | 90 days - extendable up to 180-days stay within a one-year period |
| Comoros | Visa on arrival | | |
| Republic of the Congo | Visa required | | |
| Democratic Republic of the Congo | eVisa | | |
| Costa Rica | Visa not required | 90 days | |
| Côte d'Ivoire | eVisa | 3 months | eVisa holders must arrive via Port Bouet Airport. |
| Croatia | Visa not required | 90 days | 90 days within any 180 day period in the Schengen Area |
| Cuba | eVisa | 30 days | |
| Cyprus | Visa not required | 90 days | 90 days within any 180 day period |
| Czech Republic | Visa not required | 90 days | 90 days within any 180 day period in the Schengen Area |
| Denmark | Visa not required | 90 days | 90 days within any 180 day period in the Schengen Area |
| Djibouti | eVisa | 31 days | |
| Dominica | Visa not required | 21 days | |
| Dominican Republic | Visa not required | 90 days | |
| Ecuador | Visa not required | 90 days | |
| Egypt | Visa on arrival | 30 days | |
| El Salvador | Visa not required | 3 months | |
| Equatorial Guinea | eVisa | | |
| Eritrea | Visa required | | |
| Estonia | Visa not required | 90 days | 90 days within any 180 day period in the Schengen Area |
| Eswatini | Visa not required | 30 days | |
| Ethiopia | eVisa | up to 90 days | eVisa holders must arrive via Addis Ababa Bole International Airport |
| Fiji | Visa required | | |
| Finland | Visa not required | 90 days | 90 days within any 180 day period in the Schengen Area |
| France | Visa not required | | Under bilateral agreement Andorran nationals have equal rights to EU nationals. |
| Gabon | eVisa | | eVisa visa holders must arrive via Libreville International Airport. |
| Gambia | Visa not required | 90 days | |
| Georgia | Visa not required | 365 days / 1 year | |
| Germany | Visa not required | 90 days | 90 days within any 180 day period in the Schengen Area |
| Ghana | Visa required | | |
| Greece | Visa not required | 90 days | 90 days within any 180 day period in the Schengen Area |
| Grenada | Visa required | | |
| Guatemala | Visa not required | 90 days | |
| Guinea | eVisa | 90 days | |
| Guinea-Bissau | eVisa / Visa on arrival | 90 days | |
| Guyana | Visa required | | |
| Haiti | Visa not required | 90 days | |
| Honduras | Visa not required | 3 months | |
| Hungary | Visa not required | 90 days | 90 days within any 180 day period in the Schengen Area |
| Iceland | Visa not required | 90 days | 90 days within any 180 day period in the Schengen Area |
| India | e-Visa | | e-Visa holders must arrive via 32 designated airports (Note: Ahmedabad; Amritsar; Bagdogra; Bengaluru; Bhubaneswar; Chandigarh; Chennai; Coimbatore; Delhi; Gaya; Goa-Dabolim; Goa-Manohar; Guwahati; Hyderabad; Indore; Jaipur; Kannur; Kochi; Kolkata; Kozhikode; Lucknow; Madurai; Mangaluru; Mumbai; Nagpur; Port Blair; Pune; Surat; Thiruvananthapuram; Tiruchirappalli; Varanasi; Visakhapatnam) or 5 designated seaports. (Note: Chennai; Cochin; Mormugao (Goa); Mumbai; Mangalore); An Indian e-Tourist Visa may only be obtained twice within 1 calendar year.; Foreigners of Pakistani origin or who hold a Pakistani Passport are not eligible for an e-Visa. Foreigners who are not Pakistani nationals, but whose parents or grandparents (either paternal or maternal) were born in, or were permanent residents in Pakistan, are also not eligible for an e-Visa. |
| Indonesia | E-VOA / Visa on arrival | 30 days | |
| Iran | eVisa/Visa on arrival | 15 days. | |
| Iraq | eVisa | | |
| Ireland | Visa not required | 90 days | |
| Israel | Electronic Travel Authorization | 3 months | |
| Italy | Visa not required | 90 days | 90 days within any 180 day period in the Schengen Area |
| Jamaica | Visa not required | 90 days | |
| Japan | Visa not required | 90 days | |
| Jordan | eVisa / Visa on arrival | | Conditions apply |
| Kazakhstan | Visa not required | 90 days | 90 days within any 365-day period |
| Kenya | Electronic Travel Authorisation | 3 months | Applications can be submitted up to 90 days prior to travel and must be submitted at least 3 days in advance.; eTA fee is USD 32.50.; Proof of reservation at the hotel where visitors plan to stay is required (if staying with friends, an invitation letter is also acceptable).; Yellow fever vaccination certificate is required if coming from endemic countries. |
| Kiribati | Visa required | | |
| North Korea | Visa required | | |
| South Korea | Electronic Travel Authorization | 30 days | |
| Kuwait | eVisa / Visa on arrival | 3 months | |
| Kyrgyzstan | Visa not required | 60 days | |
| Laos | eVisa / Visa on arrival | 30 days | 18 (Note: Savannakhet Airport; Lanetoui - Mengkang (China); Meuangmom - Wan Pong (Myanmar); Banvang - Ban Khok Phai (Thailand); Namngeun - Huay Kon (Thailand); Paksan - Bueng Kan (Thailand); Paktaphan - Pak Saeng (Thailand); Pangmon - Ban Huak (Thailand); Phoudou (Thailand); Dak ta ock - Nam Giang (Vietnam); La Lai (Vietnam); Namkan (Vietnam); Namphao - Cau Treo (Vietnam); Namsoy - Na Meo (Vietnam); Naphao - Cha Lo (Vietnam); Pahang - Long Sap (Vietnam); Panghok - Tây Trang (Vietnam); Phoukeua - Bo Y (Vietnam)) of the 33 border crossings are only open to regular visa holders.; e-Visa may be used to enter Laos through the Luang Prabang, Pakse and Vientiane international airports, 3 Thai-Lao Friendship Bridges (Note: Vientiane (Friendship Bridge 1); Savannakhet (Friendship Bridge 2); Bokeo (Friendship Bridge 4)), in Boten (road and railroad), and in Vientiane (at Khamsavath railway station).; Visa on arrival is available at the Luang Prabang, Pakse and Vientiane international airports, 4 Thai-Lao Friendship Bridges (Note: Vientiane (Friendship Bridge 1); Savannakhet (Friendship Bridge 2); Khammouane (Friendship Bridge 3); Bokeo (Friendship Bridge 4)) and 7 border crossings. (Note: Nongnokkheane - Trapeang Kriel (Cambodia); Boten - Bo han (China); Golden Triangle/Samliemkham (Thailand); Khamsavath railway station (Thailand); Namheuang - Ban Na Kraseng (Thailand); Vang tao - Chongmek (Thailand); Dansavan - Lao Bảo (Vietnam)) |
| Latvia | Visa not required | 90 days | 90 days within any 180 day period in the Schengen Area |
| Lebanon | Free visa on arrival | 1 month | Extendable for 2 additional months; Granted free of charge at Beirut International Airport or any other port of entry if there is no Israeli visa or seal, holding a telephone number, an address in Lebanon, and a non refundable return or circle trip ticket. |
| Lesotho | eVisa | | |
| Liberia | Visa required | | Must apply online for the visa on arrival. |
| Libya | eVisa | | |
| Liechtenstein | Visa not required | 90 days | 90 days within any 180 day period in the Schengen Area |
| Lithuania | Visa not required | 90 days | 90 days within any 180 day period in the Schengen Area |
| Luxembourg | Visa not required | 90 days | 90 days within any 180 day period in the Schengen Area |
| Madagascar | eVisa / Visa on arrival | 90 days | |
| Malawi | eVisa / Visa on arrival | 90 days | |
| Malaysia | Visa not required | 30 days | |
| Maldives | Free visa on arrival | 30 days | |
| Mali | Visa not required | | |
| Malta | Visa not required | 90 days | 90 days within any 180 day period in the Schengen Area |
| Marshall Islands | Visa on arrival | 90 days | |
| Mauritania | eVisa | | Available at Nouakchott–Oumtounsy International Airport. |
| Mauritius | Visa on arrival | 60 days | |
| Mexico | Visa not required | 180 days | |
| Micronesia | Visa not required | 30 days | |
| Moldova | Visa not required | 90 days | 90 days within any 180 days period |
| Monaco | Visa not required | | |
| Mongolia | eVisa | 30 days | |
| Montenegro | Visa not required | 90 days | |
| Morocco | Visa not required | 3 months | |
| Mozambique | eVisa / Visa on arrival | 30 days | Obtainable at Maputo Airport |
| Myanmar | Visa required | | |
| Namibia | eVisa/Visa on arrival | | |
| Nauru | Visa required | | |
| Nepal | eVisa / Visa on arrival | 90 days | |
| Netherlands | Visa not required | 90 days | 90 days within any 180 day period in the Schengen Area |
| New Zealand | Electronic Travel Authority | 3 months | International Visitor Conservation and Tourism Levy must be paid upon requesting an Electronic Travel Authority.; Holders of an Australian Permanent Resident Visa or Resident Return Visa may be granted a New Zealand Resident Visa on arrival permitting indefinite stay (pursuant to the Trans-Tasman Travel Arrangement), subject to meeting character requirements and obtaining an Electronic Travel Authority prior to departure. Such travellers are not required to pay the International Visitor Conservation and Tourism Levy. |
| Nicaragua | Visa not required | 90 days | |
| Niger | Visa required | | |
| Nigeria | eVisa | | |
| Norway | Visa not required | 90 days | 90 days within any 180 day period in the Schengen Area |
| North Macedonia | Visa not required | 90 days | |
| Oman | eVisa | 30 days | |
| Pakistan | eVisa | 90 days | |
| Palau | Free visa on arrival | 30 days | |
| Panama | Visa not required | 180 days | |
| Papua New Guinea | eVisa / Free visa on arrival | 30 days | |
| Paraguay | Visa not required | 90 days | |
| Peru | Visa not required | 183 days | |
| Philippines | Visa not required | 30 days | |
| Poland | Visa not required | 90 days | 90 days within any 180 day period in the Schengen Area |
| Portugal | Visa not required | | Under bilateral agreement Andorran nationals have equal rights to EU nationals. |
| Qatar | eVisa / Visa on arrival | 30 days | Available at Hamad International Airport.; eVisa is also available. |
| Romania | Visa not required | 90 days | 90 days within any 180 day period in the Schengen Area |
| Russia | Visa not required | 90 days | 90 days within any 365-day period |
| Rwanda | eVisa / Visa on arrival | | |
| Saint Kitts and Nevis | eVisa | | |
| Saint Lucia | Visa not required | 6 weeks | |
| Saint Vincent and the Grenadines | Visa not required | 1 month | |
| Samoa | Visa not required | 60 days | |
| San Marino | Visa not required | | |
| São Tomé and Príncipe | Visa not required | 15 days | |
| Saudi Arabia | eVisa / Visa on arrival | 90 days | |
| Senegal | Visa on arrival | 90 days | Must hold an invitation letter.; Visa available online. |
| Serbia | Visa not required | 90 days | |
| Seychelles | Free Visitor's Permit on arrival | 3 months | |
| Sierra Leone | eVisa | | |
| Singapore | Visa not required | 90 days | |
| Slovakia | Visa not required | 90 days | 90 days within any 180 day period in the Schengen Area |
| Slovenia | Visa not required | 90 days | 90 days within any 180 day period in the Schengen Area |
| Solomon Islands | Free Visitor's permit on arrival | 3 months | |
| Somalia | eVisa | 30 days | Available at Bosaso Airport, Galcaio Airport and Mogadishu Airport. |
| South Africa | Visa not required | 90 days | |
| South Sudan | Electronic Visa | | Obtainable online; Printed visa authorization must be presented at the time of travel |
| Spain | Visa not required | | Under bilateral agreement Andorran nationals have equal rights to EU nationals. |
| Sri Lanka | eVisa / Visa on arrival | 30 days | Electronic Travel Authorization can also be obtained on arrival.; 30 days extendable to 6 months.; The standard visitor visa allows a stay of 60 days within any 6-month period.; Visa fees (for Standard visitor visa): SAARC - USD 35; Non SAARC - USD 75; e-Visa categories will be charged an additional USD 18.50 service fee.; If transiting from any of the Sri Lankan airports, An e-Visa is exempted (2 day transit period). |
| Sudan | Visa required | | |
| Suriname | eVisa | | |
| Sweden | Visa not required | 90 days | 90 days within any 180 day period in the Schengen Area |
| Switzerland | Visa not required | 90 days | 90 days within any 180 day period in the Schengen Area |
| Syria | eVisa | | |
| Tajikistan | Visa not required | 30 days | Visa also available online. |
| Tanzania | eVisa / Visa on arrival | 3 months | |
| Thailand | Visa not required | 60 days | |
| Timor-Leste | Visa on arrival | 30 days | |
| Togo | eVisa | 15 days | |
| Tonga | Visa required | | |
| Trinidad and Tobago | Visa required | | |
| Tunisia | Visa not required | 3 months | |
| Turkey | Visa not required | 3 months | |
| Turkmenistan | Visa required | | |
| Tuvalu | Visa on arrival | 1 month | |
| Uganda | eVisa / Visa on arrival | | May apply online. |
| Ukraine | Visa not required | 90 days | 90 days within any 180 day period. |
| United Arab Emirates | Visa not required | 30 days | Extension possible with a fee. |
| United Kingdom | Electronic Travel Authorisation | 6 months | |
| United States | Visa Waiver Program | 90 days | Visa required if Nationals of VWP countries who have traveled or been present in Iraq, North Korea, Syria, Iran, Sudan, Libya, Somalia, or Yemen at any time on or after March 1, 2011 (with limited exceptions), or those who have traveled or being present in Cuba at any time on or after January 12th 2021, or nationals of VWP countries who are also nationals of Iraq, Syria, Iran, North Korea or Sudan.; On arrival from overseas; ESTA (valid for 2 years when issued) required if arriving by air or cruise ship. |
| Uruguay | Visa not required | 3 months | |
| Uzbekistan | Visa not required | 30 days | |
| Vanuatu | Visa not required | 30 days | |
| Vatican City | Visa not required | | |
| Venezuela | Visa not required | 90 days | |
| Vietnam | eVisa | 30 days | |
| Yemen | Visa required | | |
| Zambia | Visa not required | 90 days | |
| Zimbabwe | Visa on arrival | 3 months | |

=== Dependent, disputed, or restricted territories ===
Visa requirements for Andorran citizens for visits to various territories, disputed areas, partially recognized countries and restricted zones:

| Visitor to | Visa requirement | Notes (excluding departure fees) |
Asia - Europe
| Hong Kong | Visa not required | 90 days |
| Macao | Visa not required | 90 days |
| Kosovo | Visa not required | 90 days |
| Taiwan | Visa not required | 90 days |

== Non-visa restrictions ==
=== Blank passport pages ===
Many countries require a minimum number of blank pages to be available in the passport being presented, typically one or two pages. Endorsement pages, which often appear after the visa pages, are not counted as being valid or available.

=== Vaccination ===
Cover of the new International Certificate of Vaccination issued by the Bureau of Quarantine in the Philippines since 2021

The African countries of Angola, Benin, Burkina Faso, Burundi, Cameroon, Central African Republic, Democratic Republic of the Congo, Republic of the Congo, Côte d'Ivoire, Gabon, Ghana, Guinea-Bissau, Mali, Niger, Sierra Leone and Togo, South Sudan and Uganda, along with French Guiana in South America, require all incoming passengers older than nine months to one year, to have a current International Certificate of Vaccination or Prophylaxis.

Some other countries require vaccination only if the passenger is coming from an infected area or has visited one recently or has transited for 12 hours in those countries: Algeria, Botswana, Cabo Verde, Chad, Djibouti, Egypt, Eswatini, Ethiopia, Gambia, Ghana, Guinea, Lesotho, Libya, Equatorial Guinea, Eritrea, Madagascar, Malawi, Mauritania, Mauritius, Mozambique, Namibia, Nigeria, Papua New Guinea, Seychelles, Somalia, South Africa, Sudan, Tunisia, Uganda, Tanzania, Zambia and Zimbabwe.

=== Passport validity length ===
Very few countries, such as Paraguay, just require a valid passport on arrival.

However many countries and groupings now require only an identity card – especially from their neighbours. Other countries may have special bilateral arrangements that depart from the generality of their passport validity length policies to shorten the period of passport validity required for each other's citizens or even accept passports that have already expired (but not been cancelled).

Some countries, such as Japan, Ireland and the United Kingdom, require a passport valid throughout the period of the intended stay.

In the absence of specific bilateral agreements, countries requiring passports to be valid for at least 6 more months on arrival include Afghanistan, Algeria, Anguilla, Bahrain, Bhutan, Botswana, British Virgin Islands, Brunei, Cambodia, Cameroon, Cape Verde, Cayman Islands, Central African Republic, Chad, Comoros, Costa Rica, Côte d'Ivoire, Curaçao, Ecuador, Egypt, El Salvador, Equatorial Guinea, Fiji, Gabon, Guinea Bissau, Guyana, Haiti, India, Indonesia, Iran, Iraq, Israel, Jordan, Kenya, Kiribati, Kuwait, Laos, Madagascar, Malaysia, Marshall Islands, Mongolia, Myanmar, Namibia, Nepal, Nicaragua, Nigeria, Oman, Palau, Papua New Guinea, Peru, Philippines, Qatar, Rwanda, Samoa, Saudi Arabia, Singapore, Solomon Islands, Somalia, Sri Lanka, Sudan, Suriname, Tanzania, Thailand, Timor-Leste, Tokelau, Tonga, Turkey, Tuvalu, Uganda, United Arab Emirates, Vanuatu, Venezuela, and Vietnam.

Countries requiring passports valid for at least 4 months on arrival include Micronesia and Zambia.

Countries requiring passports with a validity of at least 3 months beyond the date of intended departure include Azerbaijan, Bosnia and Herzegovina, Honduras, Montenegro, Nauru, Moldova and New Zealand. Similarly, the EEA countries of Iceland, Liechtenstein, Norway, all European Union countries (except Ireland) together with Switzerland also require 3 months validity beyond the date of the bearer's intended departure unless the bearer is an EEA or Swiss national.

Countries requiring passports valid for at least 3 months on arrival include Albania, North Macedonia, Panama, and Senegal.

Bermuda requires passports to be valid for at least 45 days upon entry.

Countries that require a passport validity of at least one month beyond the date of intended departure include Eritrea, Hong Kong, Lebanon, Macau, the Maldives and South Africa.

==== Maximum passport age ====
Countries of the Schengen area require non-EU passports to be less than 10 years old upon entry.

=== Criminal record ===
Some countries, including Australia, Canada, Fiji, New Zealand and the United States, routinely deny entry to non-citizens who have a criminal record, while others impose restrictions depending on the type of conviction and the length of the sentence.

=== Persona non grata ===
The government of a country can declare a diplomat persona non grata, banning them from entering the country or expelling them if they have already entered. In non-diplomatic use, the authorities of a country may also declare a foreigner persona non grata permanently or temporarily, usually because of unlawful activity.

=== Israeli stamps ===
Kuwait, Lebanon, Libya, and Yemen do not allow entry to people with passport stamps from Israel or whose passports have either a used or an unused Israeli visa, or where there is evidence of previous travel to Israel such as entry or exit stamps from neighbouring border posts in transit countries such as Jordan and Egypt.

To circumvent this Arab League boycott of Israel, the Israeli immigration services have now mostly ceased to stamp foreign nationals' passports on either entry to or exit from Israel (unless the entry is for some work-related purposes). Since 15 January 2013, Israel no longer stamps foreign passports at Ben Gurion Airport. Passports are still (as of 22 June 2017) stamped at Erez when passing into and out of Gaza.

Iran refuses admission to holders of passports containing an Israeli visa or stamp that is less than 12 months old.

=== Biometrics ===
Several countries mandate that all travellers, or all foreign travellers, be fingerprinted on arrival and will refuse admission to or even arrest travellers who refuse to comply. In some countries, such as the United States, this may apply even to transit passengers who merely wish to change planes rather than go landside.

Fingerprinting countries/regions include Afghanistan, Argentina, Brunei, Cambodia, China, Ethiopia, Ghana, Guinea, India, Japan, Kenya (both fingerprints and a photo are taken), Malaysia upon entry and departure, Mongolia, Saudi Arabia, the Schengen Area, Singapore, South Korea, Taiwan, Thailand, Uganda, the United Arab Emirates and the United States.

Many countries also require a photo be taken of people entering the country. The United States, which does not fully implement exit control formalities at its land frontiers (although long mandated by its own legislation), intends to implement facial recognition for passengers departing from international airports to identify people who overstay their visa.

Together with fingerprint and face recognition, iris scanning is one of three biometric identification technologies internationally standardised since 2006 by the International Civil Aviation Organization (ICAO) for use in e-passports and the United Arab Emirates conducts iris scanning on visitors who need to apply for a visa. The United States Department of Homeland Security has announced plans to greatly increase the biometric data it collects at US borders. In 2018, Singapore began trials of iris scanning at three land and maritime immigration checkpoints.

== See also ==
- Visa policy of Andorra
- Visa policy of the Schengen Area
- Andorran passport
- Foreign relations of Andorra
