= Lord of Caboet =

Catalan nobleman

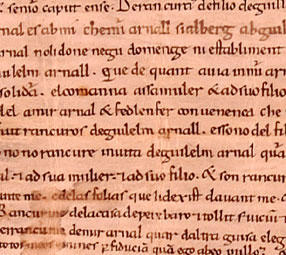
Part of the Complaints of Guitard Isarn (Greuges de Guitard Isarn)

The Lord of Caboet was a nobleman who was called upon by the Bishop of Urgell to provide military protection of Andorra after Count Borrell II of Urgell gave the Andorran valleys to the Diocese of Urgell in 988 in exchange for land in Cerdanya. In 1095, the lord of Caboet and the bishop of Urgell signed under oath a declaration of their co-sovereignty over Andorra. The male line of Caboet died out with Arnau de Caboet in 1201 or 1203, and so the rule passed to his daughter Arnalda. The bishop of Urgell arranged for Arnalda to marry Bertran de Tarascó, after whose death she married the Viscount Arnau of Castellbó. Upon the death of Bernat, who was Arnalda's son from her first marriage, her daughter Ermessenda de Castellbó became heir, and when she married Roger-Bernard II, Count of Foix, the co-principate of Andorra passed to the Count of Foix.
