= Andorran nationality law =

Andorran Citizenship Act

Parliament of Andorra
- Long title: An Act relating to Andorran citizenship
- Enacted by: Government of Andorra
- Status: Current legislation

Andorran nationality law is based primarily on the principle of jus sanguinis.

== Eligibility for Andorran citizenship ==
=== By descent ===
Children born to recognised parents who were Andorran citizens at the time of birth (regardless of the place of birth) are eligible for Andorran citizenship.

=== By birth ===
Children born in Andorra under any one of the following conditions are eligible for Andorran citizenship:

- born to parents of whom either one (or both) was born in Andorra and was living permanently and principally in Andorra at the time of birth.
- born to non-Andorran parents who were living permanently and principally in Andorra for at least 10 years at the time of birth.

=== By naturalisation ===
Those seeking to become Andorran citizens via naturalisation are required to fulfill the following criteria:

- they must renounce existing foreign citizenships.
- they must have resided in Andorra permanently for at least 10 years if the applicant has spent all of their mandatory education in Andorra or for at least 20 years if they can prove their integration into Andorran society.

== Loss of citizenship ==
If an Andorran citizen serves in the armed forces or government of another country or takes up a foreign citizenship, they automatically forfeit their Andorran citizenship.

Former Andorran citizens may restore their former citizenship if their request to the government is successful.

Any Andorran may live in France without requesting a visa.

== Dual nationality ==
Dual nationality is strictly forbidden by Andorran law. On the other hand, Spanish law recognizes dual nationality with Andorra.

== See also ==
- Andorran passport
