= Andorran passport =

Passport issued to citizens of Andorra

Andorran passport; Passaport andorrà
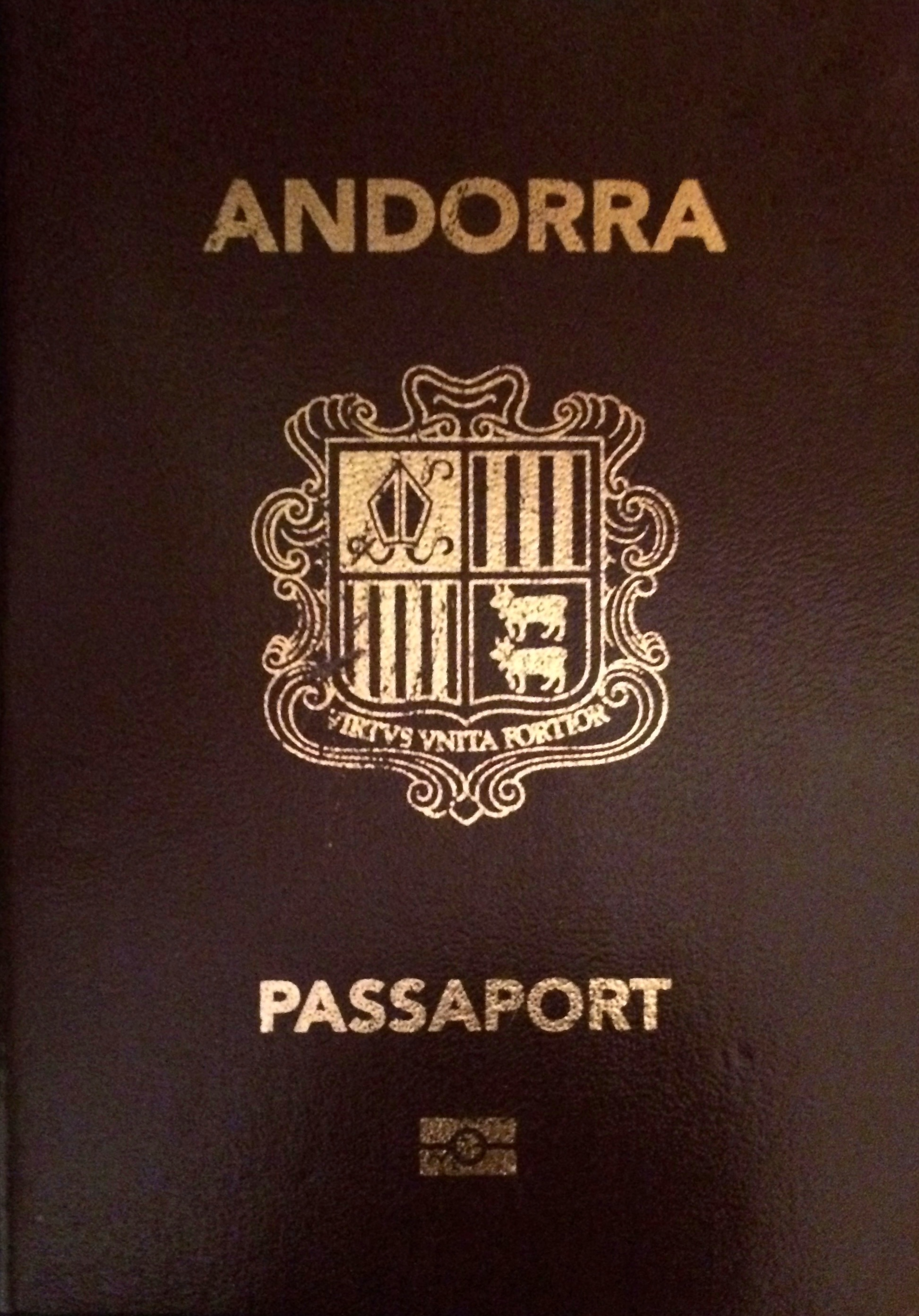
- The front cover of a contemporary Andorran biometric passport (with chip)
- Type: Passport
- Issued by: Immigration office of Principality of Andorra
- First issued: 8 February 2007 (biometric passport)
- Purpose: Identification
- Eligibility: Andorran citizenship
- Expiration: 5 years (Child aged 0-17) 5 years (Adult aged 18-19) 10 years (Adult aged 20+)
- Cost: EUR32.16 (Child aged 0-17) EUR32.16 (Adult aged 18-19) EUR49.31 (Adult aged 20+)

An Andorran passport (Catalan: passaport andorrà) is an identity document issued to Andorran citizens for international travel.

Although citizens of Andorra are not EU citizens, they can use the lanes for EU and EFTA citizens when crossing the external borders of the Schengen Area instead of using the desks for third-country nationals.

== Visa requirements ==
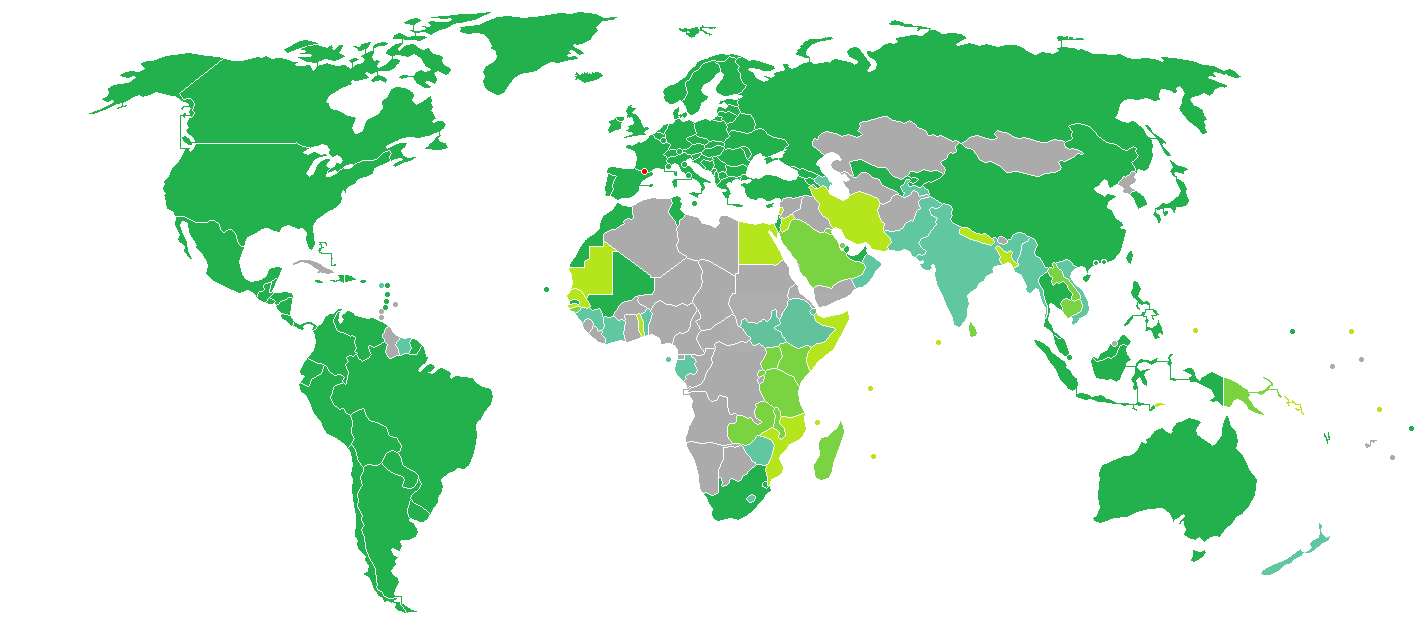
Visa requirements for Andorran citizens Andorra Visa free access Visa on arrival eVisa Visa available both on arrival or online Visa required

Visa requirements for Andorran citizens are administrative entry restrictions imposed by the authorities of other states. As 5th of December 2024, Andorran citizens had visa-free or visa on arrival access to 171 countries and territories, ranking the Andorran passport 18th in terms of travel freedom according to the Henley Passport Index.

== See also ==
- Visa policy of Andorra
