= Andorran Constitution of 1934 =

The Andorran Constitution of 1934 was purported to be the first fundamental rule of Andorra, drafted by the pretender Boris I of Andorra and the Catalan Ombudsman Pere Torras in 1934. The Constitution consisted of 17 articles and for the first time in Andorra, they introduced political freedom, freedom of religion, freedom of press, freedom of movement and freedom of thought. The king was in charge of directing the army and representing the country abroad. The document established a timid division of powers by giving parliament the power to pass laws, although the monarch could veto them.
