= Boris Skossyreff =

Belarusian adventurer and self-declared King of Andorra (1896–1989)

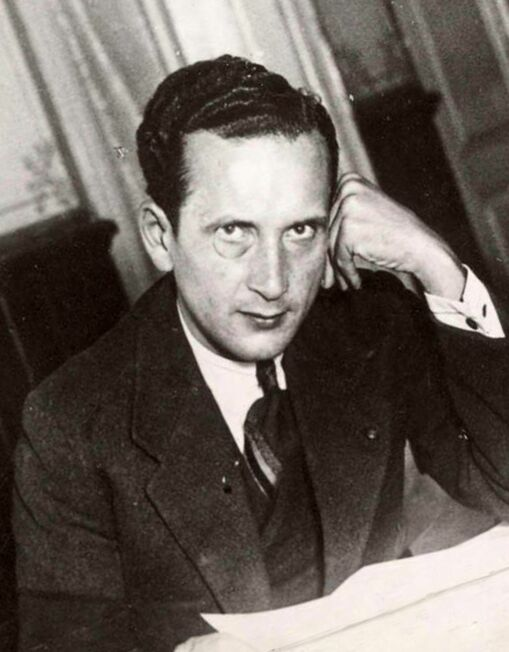
- Boris in 1934

King of Andorra
- Reign: 11 July 1934 – 20 July 1934
- Born: Borís Mikhàilovitx Skóssirev-Mavrusov; 12 June 1896; Vilna, Lithuania-Vilnius Governorate, Russian Empire (now Vilnius, Lithuania)
- Died: 27 February 1989 (aged 92); Boppard, Rhineland-Palatinate, West Germany
- Spouse: Marie-Louise Claire Parat (m. 21 March 1931)
Names
- Boris Mikhailovich Skossyreff
- Father: Michael Skossyreff
- Mother: Elisabeth Mawrusow

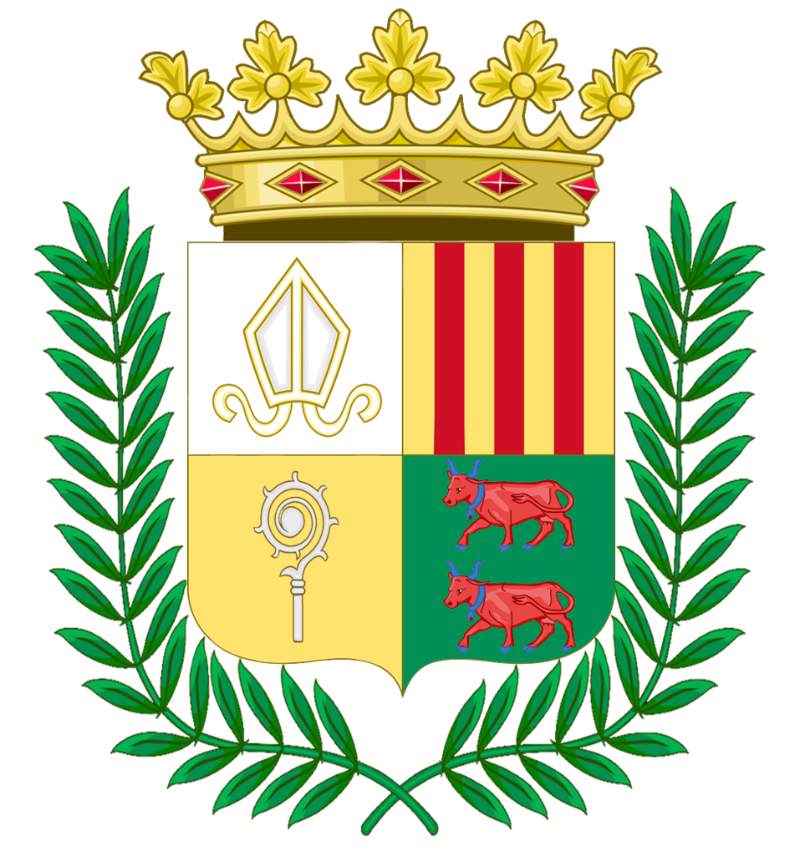
Coat of arms of Boris I as self-declared King of Andorra

Boris Mikhailovich Skossyreff (Note: Belarusian: Барыс Міхайлавіч Скосыраў, romanized: Barys Michajlavič Skosyraŭ, Russian: Бори́с Миха́йлович Ско́сырев, romanized: Boris Mikhailovich Skosyrev, pronounced [bɐˈrʲis mʲɪˈxajləvʲɪtɕ ˈskosɨrʲɪf]; Catalan: Borís Mikhàilovitx Skóssirev pronounced [boˈɾiz miˈkaj.lo.βit͡ʃ ˈes.ko.si.ɾef]) (12 June 1896 – 27 February 1989) was a Belarusian adventurer, con artist and pretender who attempted to seize the monarchy of the Principality of Andorra during the early 1930s, styling himself King Boris I of Andorra.

Skossyreff was born in Lithuania to a family of lower nobility from Belarus. Following the outbreak of the 1917 Russian Revolution, Skossyreff was able to seek political asylum in England, where he enlisted in the British army for the end of World War I. This was followed by his work in the British Foreign Office. He moved to the Netherlands in the mid-1920s, where he was in a list of Prominent Foreign Revolutionaries in 1924, prepared by the General Intelligence and Security Service, in which he was noted as an international swindler. Despite this, Skossyreff falsely claimed to have been working in the royal household of the Netherlands.

Through his visits to Andorra, a co-Principality in the Pyrenees co-princed by the Bishop of Urgell and President of France, in the early 1930s, Skossyreff worked on gaining power. During extensive conversations with local politicians in May 1934, Skossyreff presented the Government of Andorra a document in which he justified his intentions of rule.

Through falsely portraying himself as a member of the European aristocracy, Skossyreff proposed freedoms, modernisation, foreign investments and the recognition of a tax haven to Andorra through his self-published constitution.

== Early life ==
Skossyreff was born to Belarusian parents on 12 June 1896, in Vilnius, Lithuania, then part of the Russian Empire. He later acquired a Dutch passport which elaborated that his supposed title was Monsieur le Baron Boris de Skossyreff — a possible title, but likely to be false, due to the rarity of Barons in the Russian Empire. He was likely from a family of lower nobility, corresponding to his serving as an Officer in World War I.

Skossyreff's educational background is quite ambiguous. In press interviews, he spoke about a childhood friendship with Edward VIII. He also stated that he attended the prestigious Lycée Louis-le-Grand in Paris, followed by Magdalen College, Oxford. While these claims allowed Skossyreff to build up his persona, both the Lycée Louis-le-Grand and Magdalen College confirm that he was not a student.

=== Political asylum ===
Prior to his arrival in Andorra, little is known about Skossyreff. When the Russian Revolution of 1917 broke out, he was able to seek political asylum in England, where he enlisted for around two years in the British Army for the end of World War I. He told The Times that he had served in the Royal Naval Air Service's Armoured Car Service, under Oliver Locker-Lampson, which was sent to Russia to fight against the Germans.

Following World War I, Skossyreff was mentioned in multiple newspapers for cheque fraud and swindling of a gold watch.

Skossyreff was alleged to have served in the British Foreign Office, and partaken in several classified missions which took him to Siberia, Japan and the United States. He was noted by his superiors in his post-action report for his gift for languages, which gave him an ability to connect with foreigners.

In 21 March 1931, Skossyreff married Maria Luisa Parat who was ten years older than him; they divorced shortly after.

=== Supposed Dutch nobility ===
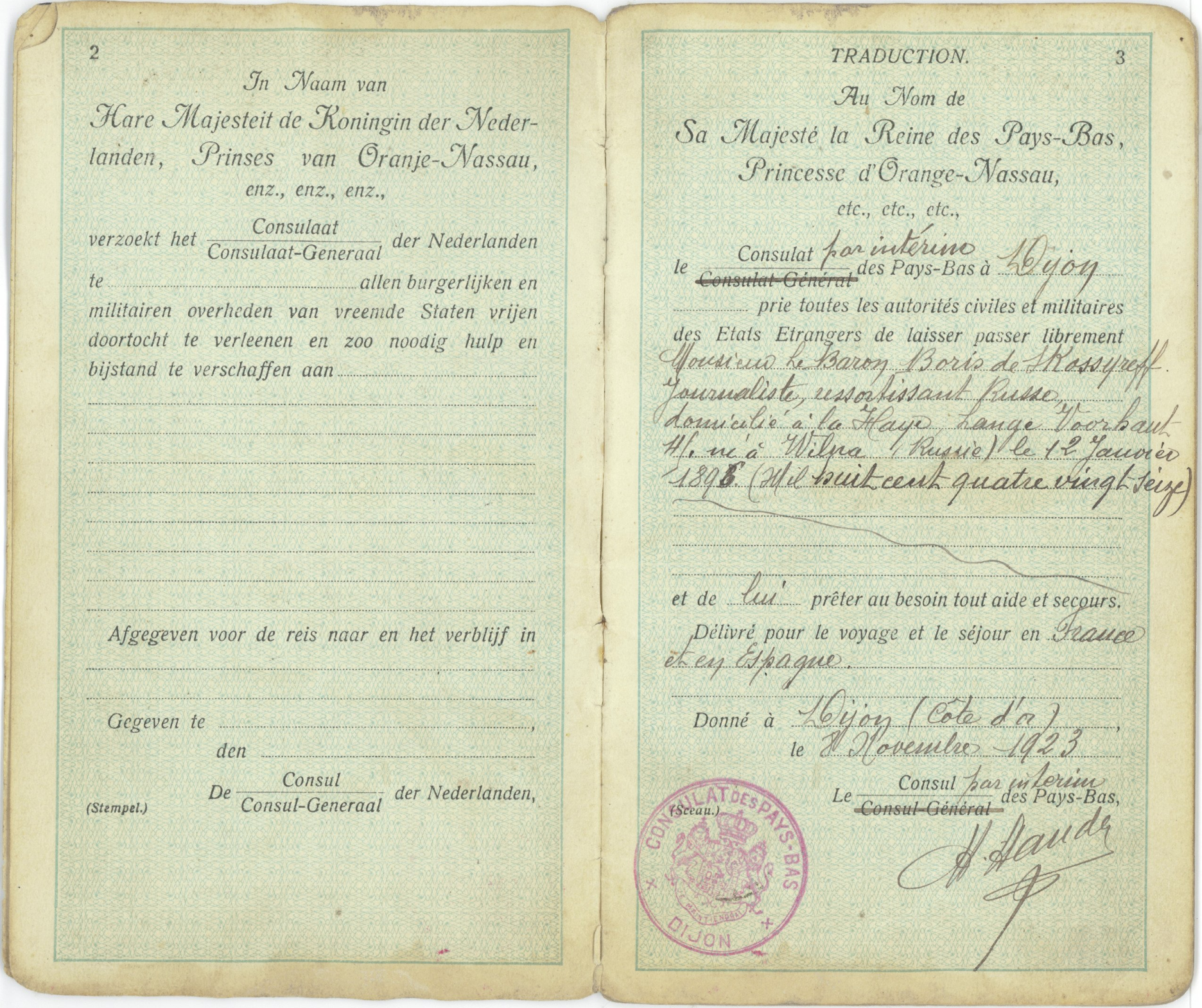
Skossyreff's Dutch Passport

Skossyreff's Foreign Office documents show that he left the service in 1925 and moved to the Netherlands, where he later claimed to have worked in the Dutch Royal Household, and to have been rewarded by Wilhelmina of the Netherlands with the title of "Count of Orange" – a title normally reserved for members of the Royal Family. The Archives of the Dutch Government establish that Skossyreff did not serve the Royal Household, nor was rewarded with a title, instead being found in a list of Prominent Foreign Revolutionaries in 1924, prepared by the General Intelligence and Security Service, in which he was listed as an "international swindler".

=== Other enterprises ===
In 1932, Skossyreff registered "Boris de Skossyreff: import - export, representation" in Santa Marta, Colombia. During this period, he was said to have learned Spanish, which he later utilised in Andorra.

== First stay in Andorra ==
On his first visit to Andorra, Skossyreff took up residence in the village of Santa Coloma d'Andorra, near Sant Julià de Lòria. During this visit, he was believed to have begun planning his "coup", having had extensive conversations with peasants, artisans and politicians across Andorra.

On the 17 May 1934, Skossyreff presented the former court prosecutor and other advisers to the General Council of the Valleys (former name of the government of Andorra) a document laden with his suggestions, in which he justified his intentions of rule. His attempt was ridiculed by Council members, who were quoted as responding: "he should not meddle in political affairs in the Valleys [of Andorra]; and that, in the event of a repeat offence, this [Council] reserves the right to raise complaints to the competent Authority so that it applies the sanctions that will be deserved. recurrent".

== Exile ==
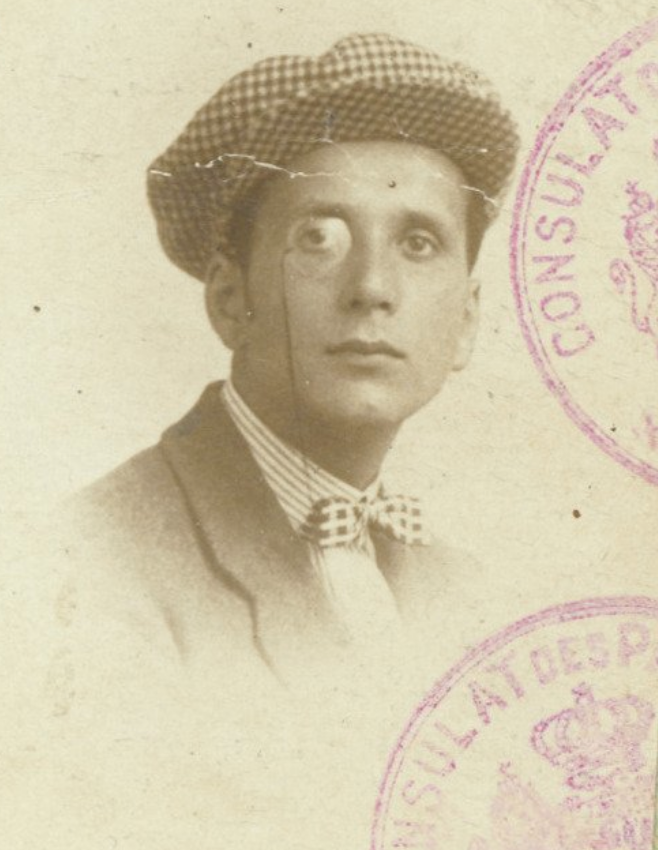
Skossyreff wearing a monocle

Skossyreff saw himself as "exiled" and settled in La Seu d'Urgell (just 5 km; 3 miles from Andorra) in the Hotel Mundial, where he began behaving like an authentic monarch; one which led to many interviews, some of them telephone calls, including those given to the newspapers The Times and The Daily Herald.

Through his attempts to gain power, Skossyreff came into contact with several Legitimist royalist groups in the south of France. In Perpignan, he managed to have his plans reach the representative of Prince Jean d'Orleáns, Duke of Guise, and pretender to the throne of France. His argument was based on the fact that the French heads of state continued to have the rights and functions of co-princes from Andorra, and as the Duke claimed to be the "rightful" King of France, he had rights over Andorra.

During his "exile", Skossyreff granted visits, made official receptions and organised numerous events, such as a mass for the late Catalan president Francesc Macià. He was seen walking around often with monocle and a baton, adopting the character and mannerisms of a monarch.

Skossyreff released an innovative constitution for Andorra that would have substantially modified the traditional Andorran political system. The Co-principality would have freedoms, modernisation, foreign investments and the recognition of a tax haven; one which was argued would bring Andorra into the modern age. Skossyreff printed ten thousand copies of his Constitution, addressed to Spanish and French celebrities. One of them, which ended up in the hands of the Bishop of the Roman Catholic Diocese of Urgell, Justí Guitart i Vilardebó, caused uproar among his close circle, where he reaffirmed that the only Co-princes of Andorra were the Bishop himself and the President of the French Republic.

== Andorran proposition ==
Skossyreff proposed to make Andorra one of the most important business centers in the world, where banks, financial entities and international companies would not waste time installing their social domicile there, taking advantage of the tax regime. In return for his new proposals, he asked the General Council to proclaim him King of Andorra.

Skossyreff's proposal was almost entirely supported by the General Council, with only one adviser against the remaining twenty-three who formed the council, the monarchy was instituted. While modern sources have variously dated Skossyreff's proclaimation to between 6 July and 8 July, contemporary sources reported that Skossyreff proclaimed himself as King of Andorra on 11 July.

Skossyreff was accompanied by his partner, the American millionaire Florence Marmon, who was the former wife of Howard Carpenter Marmon and lived together with Skossyreff as early as December 1932 in Mallorca. Marmon saw Skossyreff's campaign as a drive for freedom from the antiquated system of government, but commentators also speculated that Marmon had her own ambition of becoming a queen.

Skossyreff then declared war on the Bishop of Urgell. When Skossyreff attempted to re-enter Andorra from the "exile" after his proclamation, he was stopped by the Spanish Chief of Vigilance at La Seu d'Urgell. He responded by announcing:

"We have conquered the country in the name of the King of France (the Duc de Guise) as his Lord Lieutenant, but not at his delegated representatives [...] When we have taken possession of the country I will offer it to the Duke. My army is composed of 500 volunteers [...]. They have pledged themselves to free Andorra from French control and hand it to us.

During an interview with The Times on 18 July, Skossyreff suggested that he was still planning to enter Andorra with his forces "very soon".

== Detention ==
The pretended reign of "King Boris I" was only to last for a few days. While France did not intervene, the Bishop of Urgell commanded the Spanish Civil Guard to arrest Skossyreff; they sent three constables and a sergeant to La Seu d'Urgell to apprehend him on 20 July 1934. The next day he was transferred to Barcelona, where he was placed before a judge.

On the 23 July 1934, he was transferred to Madrid by train, accompanied by two agents. His arrival in the Spanish capital coincided with Spanish journalists, who tried to interview him. He was sent to the Modelo prison in Madrid, while acting as a monarch in exile. Historian Arnau Gonzàlez explained that during his stay at Modelo de Madrid, Boris and his collaborators continued to interpret the papers they had signed. Thus, they received several telegrams in their name, in which they guaranteed that "all documents were safe" and that they would receive a postal order of 200 pesetas. There was never an explanation on which documents or what happened to the money.

Spanish authorities noted that Skossyreff carried a Dutch passport, but declared himself to be a Russian white émigré. However, this background is somewhat contradicted by a report in the publication Spain Week by Week, which claimed on 25 July 1934, that Skossyreff was a Jew who resided for some years in Catalonia and Majorca. That account also contended that Skossyreff had made his proclamation on 11 July and that he had declared himself "Boris I, Prince of the Valleys of Andorra, Count of Orange and Baron of Skossyreff… Sovereign of Andorra and Defender of the Faith."

== Visit to Olhão ==
In Olhão, Portugal, Skossyreff met Francisco Fernandes Lopes who wrote an article in 1935 about the "King of Andorra". It was at this stage that Skossyreff finally obtained a passport and left Olhão for Genoa, where he was denied disembarkation, only to proceed to Marseille where he finally disembarked to be reunited with his French wife.

In France, the police seized his passport on 7 January 1936. Skossyreff was later said to have called Francisco Fernandes Lopes in distress with a plea to contact the then Portuguese dictator — Oliveira Salazar — to have him diplomatically intercede for him; one which seems to have occurred. After 3 months in prison in Aix-en-Provence, the French authorities allowed him to return to Portugal, where he was again arrested for not having a residence permit.

== Imprisonments and later life ==
In June 1936, he returned to Spain, coinciding with the start of the Spanish Civil War. He went on to France in 1936, where he was arrested again in Saint-Cannat. In 1938, the French authorities allowed him to return to Aix-en-Provence.

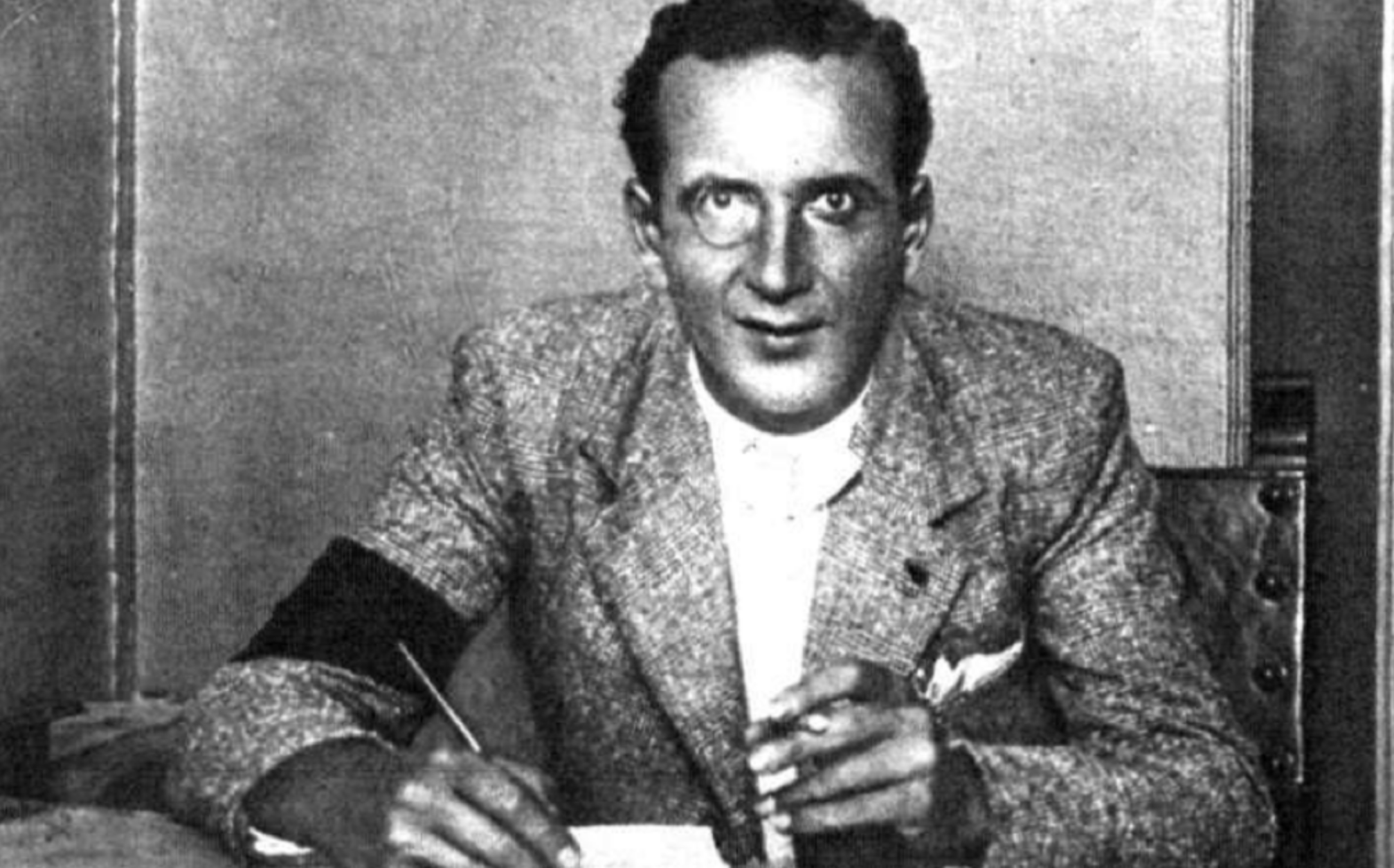
Skossyreff in 1936

In February 1939, Skossyreff was in a French prison camp with Spanish anti-Francoists, alongside Italian and Central European anti-fascists from the regions occupied by the Third Reich before World War II.

In October 1942, Skossyreff was released by the occupying Germans. He then fought on the Eastern Front in the German military.

In 1945, with the victory of the Allies, Skossyreff was arrested by the Americans in 1945 but released shortly after. He then took up residence in Boppard, West Germany. He was again arrested on 4 December 1946, by the French forces occupying Berlin. He remained in the Koblenz-Metternich prison until 17 December, and was harshly treated by the gendarmes because of his collaboration with the Nazis.

In 1948, Skossyreff was arrested by the Soviets in Eisenach, then in the Soviet occupation zone, and sentenced to a Siberian camp.

Skossyreff was released in 1956 and returned to Boppard. There he impregnated and married a woman 40 years younger than him. Skossyreff died in 1989.

== Legacy ==
A novel, titled Boris I, Rei d'Andorra (Boris I, King of Andorra) was written in 1984 by Catalan author Antoni Morell Mora. The author dedicated the book to his grandmother, who he claimed had personally met Skossyreff. It was later adapted for the stage by Beth Escuda.

Boris Craft Beer, brewed in Andorra, is named after Boris Skossyreff.

== Bibliography ==
- Barcelona's newspaper La Vanguardia reported interviews with Boris Skossyreff Conversación de los periodistas con Boris I de Andorra (Journalist interview with Boris I of Andorra) (in Spanish)
- The Times has a number of articles about Boris Skossyreff - both the takeover and the 1919 incident mentioned above (6 January 1919 p 4, 13 January p 2, 18 January p 5, and 20 January p 5).
- Regional Surveys of the World, Western Europe 2003, Fifth Edition 2003, Editors Juliet Love i Jilian O'Brien (in English)
- Thomas Eccardt. Secrets of the Seven Smallest States of Europe. Hippocrene Books, Inc. 171 Madison Avenue, New York, NY 10016. ISBN 0-7818-1032-9. (in English)
- Luis Capdevila. Nouvelle Découverte de l'Andorre. Nouvelles Editions Latines. Paris 1959, p. 180 i següents (in French)
- Gerhard Lang-Valchs, Boris von Skossyreff: rey de los andorranos, agente de los alemanes, Círculo Rojo, Almería, 2018 ISBN 9788491947097 (in Spanish)
- Miguel Izu, El rey de Andorra, Editorial Berenice, Córdobam 2018, ISBN 9788417418625 (in Spanish)

=== Files located in the National Archives (Britain) ===
- 1918: Skossyref, Boris de, Baron Services rendered to Allied Embassies in Russia. N9531/9531/38
- 1919: W38 31867 Regarding the behaviour of Major Hoshimoto in regards to Skossyreff.
- Skossyreff's Welfare file K562/562/236
- 1920: 201745/201745/38 A request for assistance by Irene Skossyreff regarding the processing of her reparation from Russia to England
- 1921 N3890/N4051/1226/38 Skossyreff-Cheshire, FC, Mrs Reparation Expenses of KL 10256/3764/295
- L 16191/16191/238 (file) Docs on release of son, Vadim Skossyreff, from Russia
- 1932 Boris Skossyreff Activities: nationality L 4227/4227/ (file)
- 1933 Boris de Skossyreff Activities abroad K 13929/1329/241
- 1934 Skossyreff, Baron, Pretender to the Throne of Andorra, Activities C5139/5139/17
- 1935 Skossyreff, Baron de, alias Boris Count of Orange alias Rollo, Capt: Portuguese enquiry respecting L1821/1821/405 (file)
