= Joan Armengol =

Andorran attorney and politician (died 2020)

Joan Armengol i Pal (1922/1923 – 16 February 2020) was an Andorran attorney and politician; he also served as Mayor (Cònsol Major) of Andorra la Vella between 1970 and 1971. During his term, he oversaw the population growth and the modernization of the city and was president of the local elections of 1971, the first in which women could vote.

Born in Andorra la Vella, he died on 16 February 2020 at the age of 97. His siblings, Ton and Lídia Armengol i Vila were also politicians. His funeral was held on 18 February.
