= Joan Carles Camp Areny =

Andorran politician

Joan Carles Camp Areny (born 21 March 1962) is a current member of the General Council of Andorra.

He held the position of the Secretary of the Trade Union. He was a member of the Legislative Commission for Territorial Policy and Urbanism Member of the Legislative Commission for Economy (March 2015 - December 2017)
