= Arenys =

Arenys, Catalan for "sands (of a seasonal creek)", may refer to:

- Arenys de Mar, municipality in the comarca of Maresme
- Arenys de Munt, municipality in the comarca of Maresme

== See also ==
- Arens de Lledó (Catalan: Arenys de Lledó), municipality in the province of Teurel
