= Visa policy of Andorra =

Policy on permits required to enter Andorra

The Andorran government imposes no visa requirements on its visitors, and requires only a passport or European Union national identity card for entrance. However, since the country is accessible only via the Schengen countries of Spain or France, entrance is not possible without entering the Schengen area first, and the Schengen visa rules can therefore be regarded as applying de facto. Because Andorra is not part of the Schengen area, a multiple entry visa is required to re-enter the Schengen area when leaving Andorra.

There are no airports for fixed-wing aircraft within Andorra's borders, but there are heliports at La Massana (Camí Heliport), Arinsal and Escaldes-Engordany with commercial helicopter services. Because of the need to go to a border control if flying outside Andorra, these helicopter services go to airports.

== Bilateral agreements ==
- Kazakhstan — signed on August 4, 2022, entered into force on February 28, 2023, allows citizens to stay without a visa up to 90 days within a 365-day period.
- Russia — signed on December 5, 2020, entered into force on November 25, 2021, allows citizens to stay without a visa up to 90 days within a 365-day period.

Diplomatic passports

- India — agreement from 2024 allows holders of diplomatic and official passports to stay without a visa up to 90 days within a 180-day period.

== Eligible international organizations ==
Individuals holding the following travel documents are not required to obtain a visa for up to 90 days:

- Council of Europe Laissez-Passer
- European Union Laissez-Passer
- United Nations Laissez-Passer
- Interpol Passport

== Residence ==
Foreign visitors, including EU citizens, looking to stay in Andorra more than 90 days require a residence permit.

However, Andorra has established bilateral residence agreements with Spain, France and Portugal regulating the entry, stay and residence of their nationals. Under these agreements, Andorran, Spanish, French, and Portuguese nationals can enjoy equal treatment in residency, employment, and professional activities, comparable to the rights granted to EU nationals in EU countries other than their own. Nationals can work in both salaried and self-employed capacities, and are allowed to invest in and manage businesses in the host country. Public sector jobs are primarily reserved for nationals, but Andorra permits Spanish, French, and Portuguese nationals to apply if positions remain unfilled by Andorrans. Family reunification is also allowed, and protections against expulsion are in place, except for reasons related to public order, security, or public health.

== See also ==
- Visa policy of the Schengen Area
- Visa requirements for Andorran citizens
- List of diplomatic missions of Andorra
- Foreign relations of Andorra
