= Maria Pilar Riba Font =

Andorran politician (1944–2026)

Maria Pilar Riba Font (10 May 1944 – 20 January 2026) was an Andorran politician. She was member of the General Council of Andorra for the Social Democratic Party of Andorra between 2005 and 2011 representing Encamp.

Riba died after a long illness on 20 January 2026, at the age of 81.
