= Antoni Puigdellívol =

Andorran businessman and politician (1946–2021)

Antoni Puigdellívol i Riberaygua (19 December 1946 – 27 January 2021) was an Andorran businessman and politician.

== Biography ==
Puigdellívol was born in Escaldes-Engordany on 19 December 1946 and studied hotel administration, soon dedicating himself to family businesses. He entered politics when he was elected deputy mayor (cònsol menor) of Andorra la Vella in 1976, office he held until 1977. He became mayor (cònsol major) of Andorra la Vella in 1978, the same year that Escaldes-Engordany ceased to be part of the municipality (parròquia) of Andorra la Vella to assume local autonomy. He left the office in 1979.

He was member of the General Council between 1982 and 1985, as he was elected in the 1981 parliamentary election. Prime Minister Albert Pintat named him Minister of Tourism and Environment on 7 June 2005, but he resigned on 12 December 2007 due to political discrepancies, ceasing his position on 12 December.

In the early morning of 27 January 2021 he died in his home at the age of 74.
