= 2010s in Andorra =

2010s in Andorra

== Events ==
=== 2010 ===
- 2010: Scheduled date for every home in Andorra to be linked to the Internet by fibre optic connexion.

=== 2011 ===
- 3 April: 2011 Andorran parliamentary election
- 4 December 2011 Andorran local elections

=== 2015 ===
- 1 March: 2015 Andorran parliamentary election – Despite losing five seats, the Democrats for Andorra narrowly retains their absolute majority in the General Council, winning 15 of the 28 seats. Antoni Marti is subsequently awarded a second term.
- 13 December: 2015 Andorran local elections
