= Pere Font Moles =

Andorran politician (1926–2025)

Pere Font Moles (1926 – 12 December 2025) was an Andorran politician, cultural activist, and printer.

== Life and career ==
Font Moles was born in Encamp, Andorra in 1926. He served as deputy mayor of Encamp between 1960–1961 and was a communal councilor between 1962 and 1963.

He was also a general councilor in the periods 1964–1967 and 1970–1973. Outside of politics, he founded Impremta Principat.

Font Moles died on 12 December 2025, at the age of 99.
