= History of the Jews in Andorra =

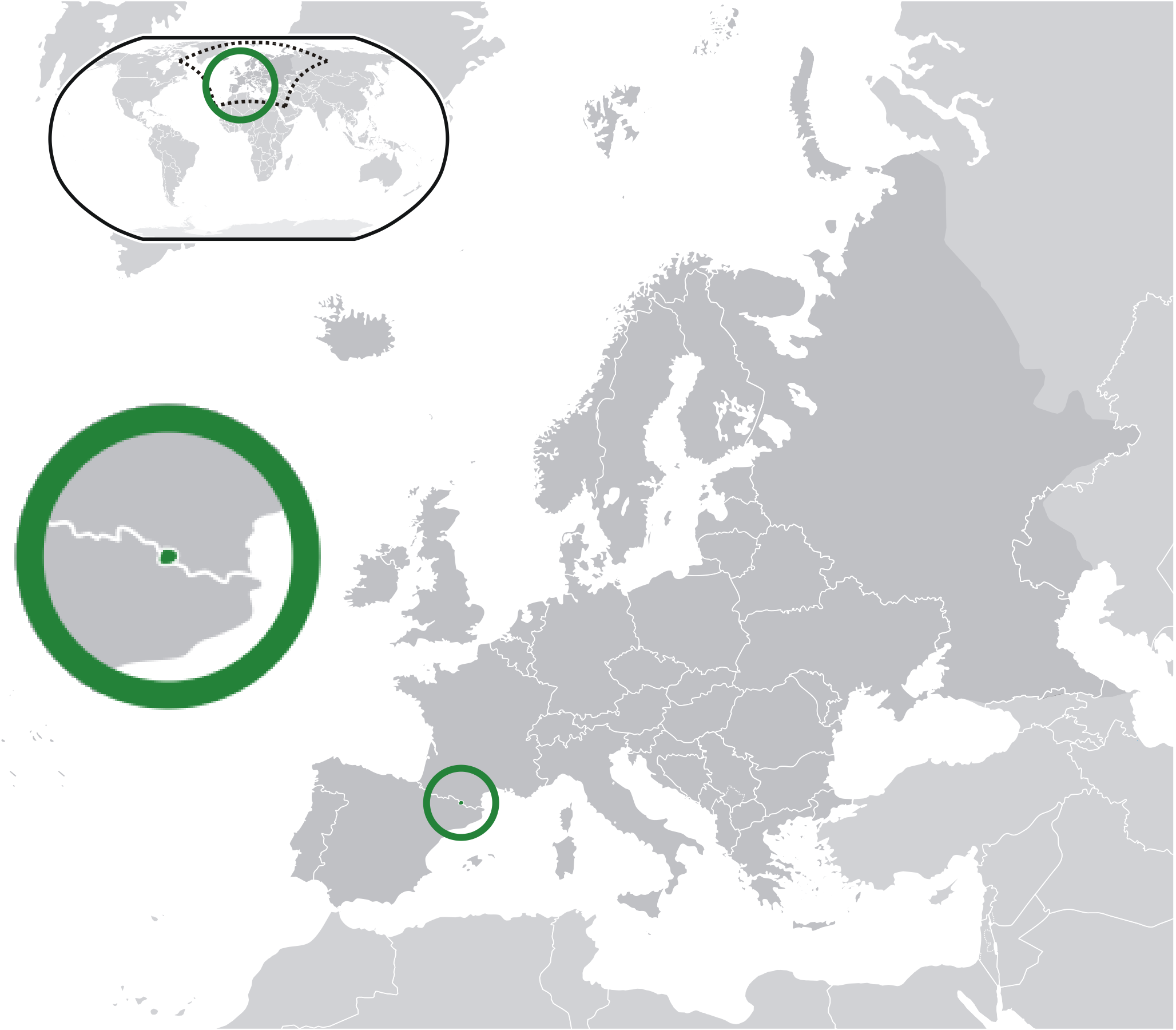
The location of Andorra in Europe

The history of the Jews in Andorra has its origins during World War II, with the majority of the 73 to 250 Jews in the country descending from Sephardic Jews who came from Morocco in the 1960s. There are no official synagogues as state law prohibits non-Catholic places of worship.

== History ==
The state religion of Andorra is Roman Catholic and all non-Catholic places of worship are banned. There was no recorded presence of Jews in Andorra until World War II. 2,000–3,000 French Jews fled to neutral Andorra during the war. Another wave of Jews came from Morocco in the 1960s.

The Associació Cultural Israelita de les Valls d’Andorra was formed in 1998, in a meeting hall underneath a medical building. There are technically no synagogues in Andorra due to religious laws, but informal ones exist. ACIV has an ark containing three donated Torah scrolls, including one from Gibraltar.

There is no Jewish cemetery in Andorra and cremation is common in the country, which contravenes Jewish traditions. Most Jews are buried in Toulouse or Barcelona instead. Negotiations with the government for a Jewish cemetery started in the early 2000s. There were no full-time rabbis in Andorra until Kuty Kalmenson's appointment with Chabad was announced on 1 December 2024.

Salomó Benchluch was elected to the General Council in 2023, becoming its first Jewish member.

== Population ==
The majority of Andorra's Jews are descended from Sephardic Jews who came from Morocco. There were around 120 Jews in 1998, but this declined to 73 in 2024, due to younger Jews not having children or moving from Andorra. Higher estimates list the current Jewish population as around 250.

== See also ==
- Andorra-Israel relations
- History of the Jews in France
- History of the Jews in Spain
- History of the Jews in Morocco

== Works cited ==
- "2022 Report on International Religious Freedom: Andorra". United States Department of State. Archived from the original on 27 April 2025.
- "La comunitat jueva acomiada la festa 'Januká'". The Forward. 9 December 2010.
- Cramer, Philissa (2 December 2024). "Andorra, where non-Catholic houses of worship are illegal, gets its first full-time rabbi". The Forward. Archived from the original on 27 April 2025.
- Luxner, Larry (19 July 2024). "Andorra's 73 Jews are proud of their tiny community. Just don't call their home base a synagogue". Jewish Telegraphic Agency. Archived from the original on 27 April 2025.
