= Josep-Lluís Serrano Pentinat =

Spanish Catholic prelate (born 1977)

The Most Reverend Josep-Lluís Serrano Pentinat
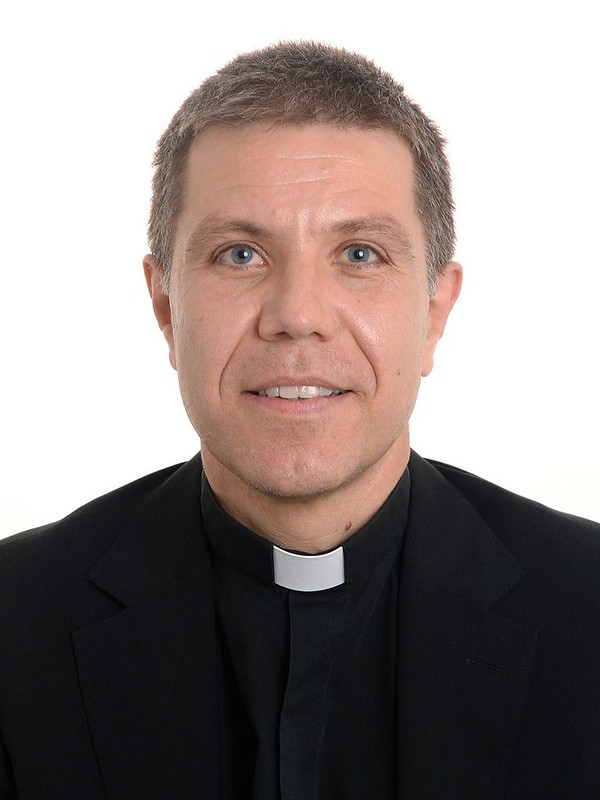
- Official portrait, 2024

Co-Prince of Andorra
- Reign: 31 May 2025 – present
- Predecessor: Joan Enric Vives i Sicília
- Co-Prince: Emmanuel Macron
- Episcopal Representatives: See list: Eduard Ibáñez
- Bishop of Urgell
- See: Urgell
- Appointed: 12 July 2024 (Coadjutor)
- Installed: 31 May 2025
- Predecessor: Joan Enric Vives i Sicília
- Previous post: Coadjutor Bishop of Urgell (2024–2025)

Orders
- Ordination: 21 April 2002 by Xavier Salinas i Vinyals
- Consecration: 21 September 2024 by Edgar Peña Parra

Personal details
- Born: 19 March 1977 (age 49) Tivissa, Catalonia, Spain
- Denomination: Catholic Church
- Coat of arms

Josep-Lluís Serrano Pentinat (Western Catalan: [dʒuˈzɛb ʎuˈis seˈrano pentiˈnat]; born 19 March 1977) is a Spanish prelate of the Catholic Church who has been serving as Bishop of Urgell and ex officio episcopal Co-Prince of Andorra since 2025. Serrano worked in the diplomatic service of the Holy See from 2012 to 2024.

== Early life ==
Serrano was born on 19 March 1977 in Tivissa, Catalonia, Spain. He is a fluent speaker of Catalan, Spanish, French, English, Italian and Portuguese. He entered the minor seminary in Tortosa at the age of 14, then entered the major seminary in 1995. He studied at the Faculty of Theology of Catalonia in Barcelona and received a Bachelor of Theology degree in 2001. Serrano was ordained as a deacon in 2001 and served in that position in the parish of the Assumption of Mary in Amposta for a year. On 21 April 2002, he was ordained as a priest by Bishop Xavier Salinas i Vinyals in the Tortosa Cathedral.

Serrano served as the priest of three rural parishes, la Palma d'Ebre, la Bisbal de Montsant and Margalef, from 2002 to 2005. He studied dogmatic theology at the Pontifical Gregorian University from 2005 to 2007 and earned a licentiate in 2007. Returning to Tortosa, he was the priest of the parishes of Sant Andreu and Sant Pere, both in the municipality Vandellòs i l'Hospitalet de l'Infant. From 2008 to 2009, he also served as moderator of the Pastoral Unit of Costa Nord. He was a lecturer at the Tortosa Major Seminary from 2007 to 2009.

Serrano studied at the Pontifical Ecclesiastical Academy in Rome from 2009 to 2012, at the Pontifical Lateran University, where he received a licentiate in canon law in 2011, and at the Pontifical Gregorian University, where he received a doctorate in dogmatic theology in 2012, with the work Palabra Sacramento y Carisma: La eclesiologia de E. Corecco.

== Career ==
=== Diplomatic role ===
Serrano was secretary of the Mozambique Nunciature from 2012 to 2016. He then served as secretary of the Nunciature in Nicaragua from 2016 to 2017, followed by the Nunciature in Brazil from 2017 to 2019. In 2019, he became a counselor of the Section for General Affairs of the Secretariat of State and by 2024 was personal secretary to Archbishop Edgar Peña Parra, substitute for the Secretary of State.

=== Bishop of Urgell and Co-Prince of Andorra (2025–present) ===
On 12 July 2024, Pope Francis appointed Serrano coadjutor bishop of the Diocese of Urgell. This meant that upon the resignation of Joan Enric Vives i Sicília, Serrano would become the Bishop of Urgell and therefore Co-Prince of Andorra. His appointment ended speculation in the local press that a diocese might be created for Andorra alone or that a change in the bishop's role as co-prince was contemplated. He received his episcopal consecration on 21 September from Archbishop Edgar Peña Parra.

On 31 May 2025, Serrano became both the Bishop of Urgell and the co-prince of Andorra following the acceptance of the resignation of Vives by Pope Leo XIV. He swore an oath to the Andorran Constitution before the General Council on 26 June 2025. In his speech, he pledged to accept "the rules of a modern, plural and non-confessional state". That same day, he received his Andorran passport from the hand of Prime Minister Xavier Espot.

Catholic Church titles
Preceded by Joan Enric Vives i Sicília	Bishop of Urgell; 2025–present	Incumbent
Regnal titles
Preceded by Joan Enric Vives i Sicília	Co-Prince of Andorra; 2025–present Served alongside: Emmanuel Macron	Incumbent
