= Sergi Mas Balaguer =

Andorran sculptor (1930–2026)

Sergi Mas Balaguer (30 October 1930 – 31 March 2026) was a Spanish-born Andorran sculptor and cultural activist.

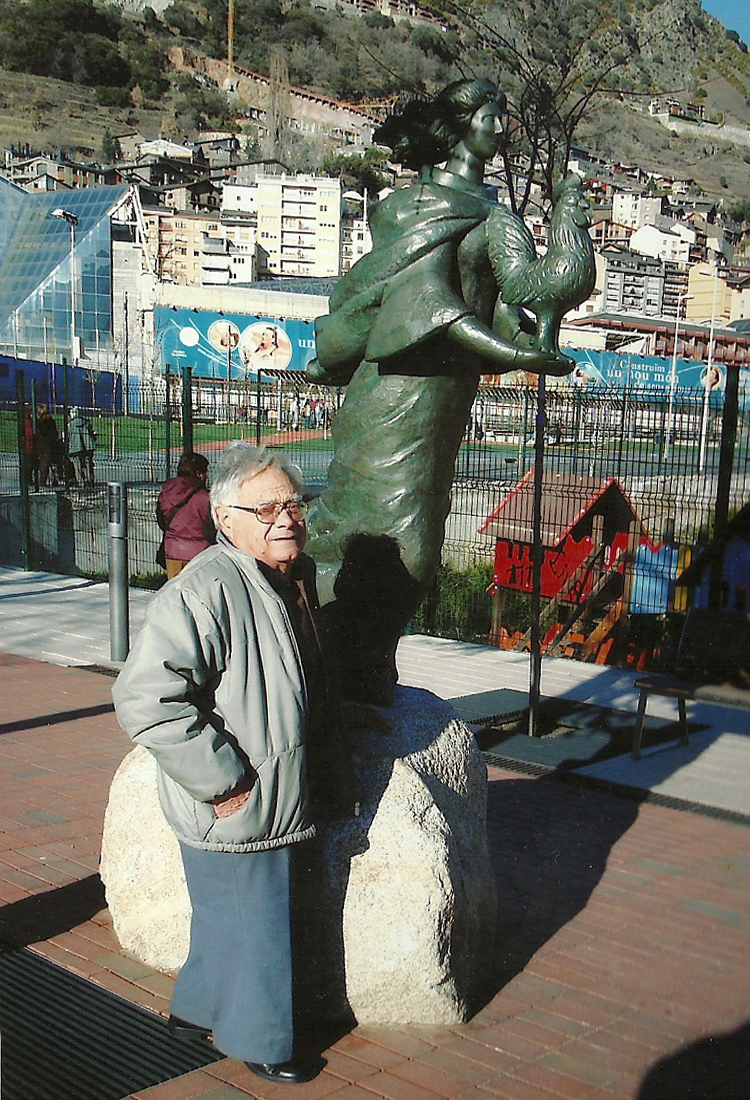
Sergi Mas Balaguer

== Life and career ==
Sergi Mas Balaguer was born in Barcelona into a family of craftsmen, his father was a cabinetmaker and his mother's family were printers. He studied at the Escola d'Arts i Oficis de la Llotja in Barcelona.

He trained at the Poble Espanyol in Montjuïc, where he worked in ceramics, engraving, printing and turning and where he met his wife and collaborator Maria Canalís, whom he married in 1955. After several commissions and trips to Andorra, in 1957 he settled in Aixovall in Sant Julià de Lòria.

Mas Balaguer participated in the renovation of the Casa de la Vall (the main house of the General Council of the valleys of Andorra), directed by Manuel Humbert and Rafael Benet: He carried out the projects and design of the furniture of the General Council room and the courtroom, as well as the decoration of the Sindicatura office, the hall of the house and other elements (1961).

In 1966 he opened a ceramics workshop with his wife in Sant Julià de Lòria, where he designed and made several models of images, figures and murals. Among his most outstanding sculptures is the new one of the image of the Virgin of Meritxell, after the destruction of the Romanesque original by a fire in 1972. He made several monumental works, such as the mural Les Benaurances on the facade of the parish church of Escaldes-Engodany, the monumental fountain Garlands and laurel in Sant Julià de Lòria or the monuments to priest Cinto Verdaguer in Ordino and Escaldes-Engordany. He also has work in public and private collections outside Andorra, such as the enameled ceramic mural of Santa Maria de Meritxell in the cloister of the monastery of Jerusalem, in Israel (1994), and other works in the Vatican and the Musée de l'Home in Paris, or the monuments dedicated to Arnaldeta de Caboet and the Council of the Earth in bronze and stone, among many others.

His work was not limited to sculpture, he also worked as an illustrator, poster artist, engraver, bookplate artist and was the author of a collection of stamps for French post dedicated to the legends of Andorra. In 2008, the French Ministry of Culture awarded him the medal of “Chevalier des Arts et des Lettres”. In November 2017, after some sixty years living in Aixovall, Sergi Mas moved to the center of Sant Julià de Lòria, a town that also made it easier for him to set up his workshop in the communal art school that, at the same time, was renamed Espai Sergi Mas.

He had his own literary work, both narrative and essay, illustrated by himself. He published the books El moble andorrà (2003) and Aspectes de l'art popular d'Andorra (2016), dedicated on the one hand to the study of traditional Andorran furniture and on the other, to the objects that make up the popular art of the same country. His artistic production was inspired by ethnology and popular art, which he reinterpreted. The theme of his works is voluntarily placed within the artistic current known as fantastic art. His creative process moved from the recreation of traditional shepherd art to the world of fantasy bordering on surrealism, applying a wide range of creative techniques, or from egg tempera, to ceramics, including engraving and sculpture. A good example of his artistic production as well as his personality is reflected in the documentary Sergi Mas, directed by his grandson, Hèctor Mas and produced by the Andorran Society of Sciences in 2016.

Mas Balaguer died 31 March 2026, at the age of 95.

== Awards ==
- Orde de Carlemany
