= Ermessenda de Castellbò =

Andorran feudal ruler (died 1237)

Ermessenda de Castellbò (died 1237), was an Andorran feudal ruler. She was suo jure ruling Viscountess of Castellbò in Andorra 1226-1237. She was born to Arnalda de Caboet and Arnaud I de Castelbon. In 1208, she married Roger-Bernard II, Count of Foix. Through her, Andorra and Foix was united in 1278. She was a Cathar. Because of her Cathar faith, her and her father's remains were exhumed and burnt by Inquisitor Pere de Cadireta in 1267.
