= Joan Pujal Areny =

Andorran politician and businessman (1937–2026)

Joan Pujal Areny (23 May 1937 – 27 January 2026) was an Andorran politician and businessman. A member of the Lauredian Union, he served as mayor of Sant Julià de Lòria between 1999 and 2003, and member of the General Council of Andorra between 1992 and 1993.

== Life and career ==
Areny was member of the General Council between 1992 and 1993 and second mayor (cònsol major) of Sant Julià de Lòria since the approval of the Constitution of Andorra between 1999 and 2003, as well as Councillor of the Commune of Sant Julià de Lòria during the same time.

He was elected to the General Council in the 1992 parliamentary election the last term of the General Council of Andorra before the approval of the Andorran constitution in a referendum, the last legislature without political parties and of short duration: between April 1992 and December 1993.

Areny died on 27 January 2026, at the age of 88.
