= COVID-19 pandemic in Andorra =

- Disease: COVID-19
- Pathogen: SARS-CoV-2
- Location: Andorra
- First outbreak: Wuhan, Hubei, China
- Index case: Andorra la Vella
- Arrival date: 2 March 2020 (6 years, 6 months and 5 days)
- Confirmed cases: 48,015
- Active cases: 1,578
- Recovered: 37,520
- Deaths: 159
- Fatality rate: 0.33%
- Vaccinations: 57,913 (total vaccinated); 53,501 (fully vaccinated); 157,072 (doses administered)

Government website
- www.govern.ad/coronavirus

The COVID-19 pandemic in Andorra was a part of the worldwide pandemic of coronavirus disease 2019 (COVID-19) caused by severe acute respiratory syndrome coronavirus 2 (SARS-CoV-2). The virus was confirmed to have reached Andorra on 2 March 2020, when a 20-year-old man returned to the country from Milan, Italy. With a total population of 77,543, (as of 31 December 2019) on 7 December 2020, the infection rate was 1 case per 11 inhabitants, and the death rate was 1 case per 994 inhabitants.

== Background ==
On 12 January 2020, the World Health Organization (WHO) confirmed that a novel coronavirus was the cause of a respiratory illness in a cluster of people in Wuhan City, Hubei Province, China, which was reported to the WHO on 31 December 2019.

The case fatality ratio for COVID-19 has been much lower than SARS of 2003, but the transmission has been significantly greater, with a significant total death toll.

== Response ==
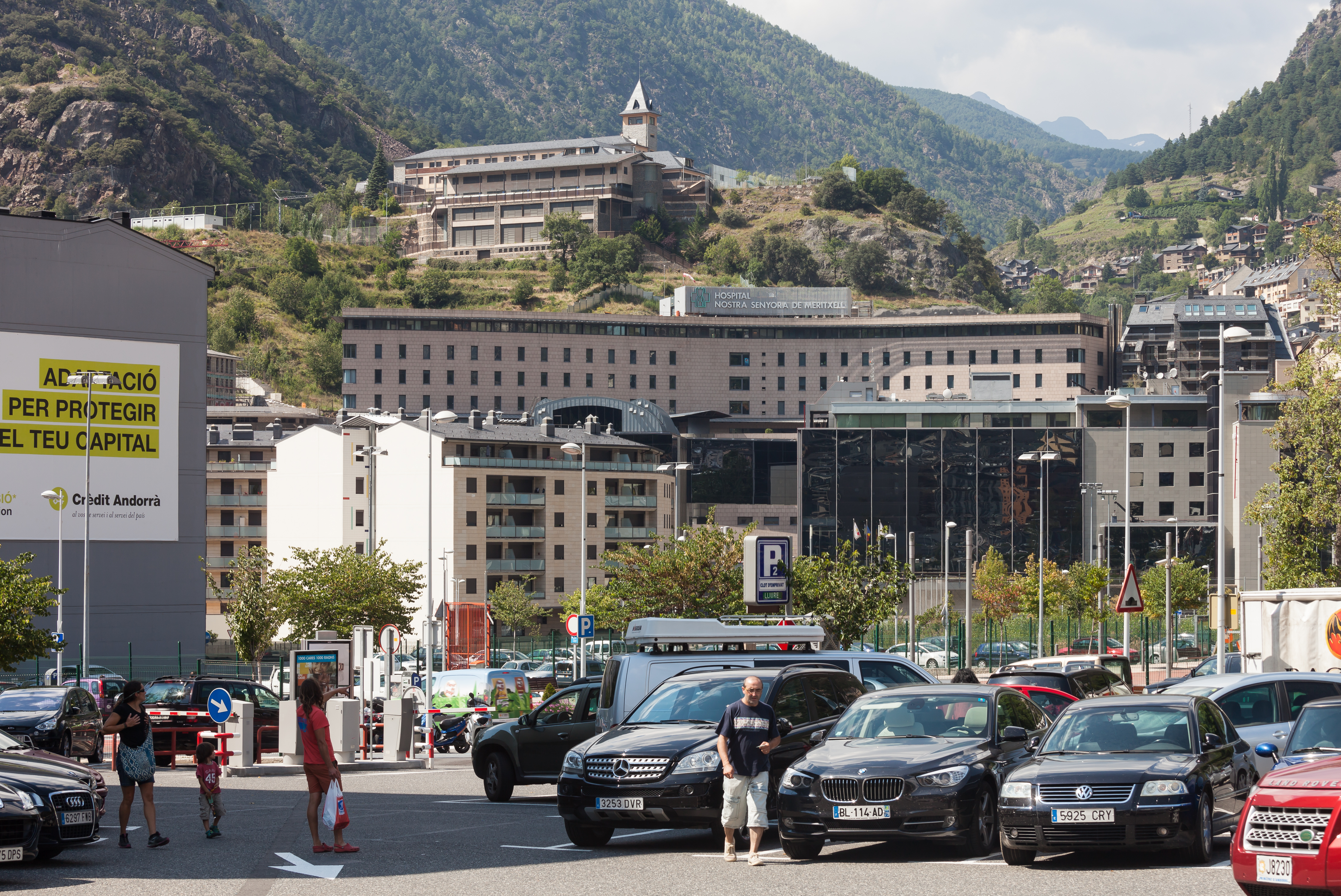
Hospital Nostra Senyora de Meritxell, in Escaldes-Engordany.

The government ordered schools closed beginning 16 March. In addition, all cultural activities planned by the government were cancelled. In an appearance on March 13 the Head of Government (Prime Minister) Xavier Espot announced that all public establishments would be closed for two weeks except those that provide essential products, gas stations, and pharmacies. The next day, Constitution Day celebrations were cancelled. In addition, the borders were restricted, and people were only permitted to leave for health reasons, to transport goods, or for residents abroad. The sale of tobacco and alcohol to tourists was prohibited, and the quantity permitted to be sold to Andorran nationals and residents was restricted.

On 16 March, Espot ordered the cessation of high-risk work activities, such as construction and "liberal" (high-education) professions, for a minimum of eight days, and public administration would be reduced to a minimal level to avoid the collapse of the healthcare system. Meanwhile, the government began working on legal steps to manage states of alarm and of emergency, provided for in the Constitution but never developed in any laws.

The government procured antibody tests at a cost of €1.5 million. While the tests will not be obligatory, being able to prove that one has antibodies can give them access to less restrictive measures.

== Timeline ==
=== March 2020 ===
On 2 March, Andorra confirmed its first coronavirus case, a 20-year-old man who had returned from Milan. The tests conducted have shown a positive infection, and he will remain in hospital for further tests and his immediate social circle will be monitored, the government said in a statement. He was discharged on 8 March.

On 12 March, a second case was confirmed, an 87-year-old woman whose daughter is a teacher. The Government announced that it would close all schools from 16 March.

On 13 March, Xavier Espot announced in a special public appearance that ordered the closure of all public establishments except basic stores, pharmacies and gas stations during two weeks.

On 14 March, the acts of the 27th day of the Constitution were not carried out after the suspension by the General Council.

On 15 March, it was announced that there were four new active cases in Andorra, making a total of 6 cases (5 of them being active at the time). All four people that contracted the virus had been in contact with the 87-year-old woman.

On 16 March the Prime Minister ordered the closing of all construction and industrial activity as the coronavirus cases amounted to 14 after a rise of 9 on the day with the highest number of cases registered.

On 17 March, the toll of cases rose to 39. The Co-Prince Joan Enric Vives Sicília addressed a special televised message calling for the calm gratitude and collaboration among all.

On 22 March, an 88-year-old man became the first confirmed death in the country as the number of cases rose to 112.

On 24 March, the third death was confirmed.

On 29 March, the Minister of Health announced that 80 of the active cases were health care staff. Further, Cuba was sending 27 nurses and 12 physicians to aid the SAAS staff.

=== April 2020 ===
On 11 April, a 79-year-old patient from La Seu d'Urgell (Lleida, Catalunya, Spain) was transferred to the ICU of Nostra Senyora de Meritxell hospital.

By 20 April, thirty-six persons had died from the coronavirus in Andorra.

On 30 April, antibody test volunteers, government workers, and their relatives were tested for antibodies.

=== May 2020 ===
From 4 May to 13 May, voluntary tests were performed on the vast majority of the population (70.468)

From 18 May to 27 May, a second voluntary test was performed on the vast majority of the population (70.468)

=== June 2020 ===
From the 1st to the 10th, Inconclusive tests were supplemented by PCR tests detecting 78 positive Cases.

=== July 2020 ===
From the 1st to the 12th, total reported cases remained unchanged at 855, but new cases were reported from 13th (3 cases), coinciding with the onset of a second wave in adjacent regions of Spain. July 16 marked one month since the last reported death in Andorra. A further 67 cases were reported by 31 July, bringing the month end total to 925 or 1.2% of the population.

=== August 2020 ===
New cases were recorded at an average rate of 4 per day during the first half of August, growing to an average of 12 per day during the second half of the month, reaching 989 by mid month and 1176 by the end of August. The 53rd death was reported on the 12th.

=== September 2020 ===
New cases were recorded at an average rate of 17.5 per day during the first half of September, and 37.8 per day during the second half.

The total number of cases in Andorra's first wave (855 reached on 18 June and unchanged until 12 July), was surpassed by the second wave on 23 September, when the total number of cases reached 1753 - Worldometer - Andorra country page.

=== October 2020 ===
On 12 October, it was announced that Minister of Finance Èric Jover tested positive for COVID-19.

=== January 2021 ===
The Andorran government has signed agreements to acquire 30 000 doses of the Pfizer BioNTech vaccine from the Spanish government at the price Spain paid and other doses of the Moderna vaccine from the French government.

== Statistics ==
=== Confirmed new cases per day ===
View source data.

=== Confirmed deaths per day ===
View source data.

== See also ==
- COVID-19 pandemic by country and territory
- COVID-19 pandemic in Europe
