= History of Andorra =

Andorra, officially the Principality of Andorra (Catalan: Principat d'Andorra), also called the Principality of the Valleys of Andorra (Catalan: Principat de les Valls d'Andorra), is a sovereign landlocked microstate in southwestern Europe, located in the eastern Pyrenees mountain range and is bordered by Spain and France.

== 9th to 18th centuries ==
Traditionally, Andorra claims to be the last independent survivor of the "Marca Hispanica", a military buffer zone made up of counties, created by Charlemagne to keep the Islamic Moors from advancing into the Christian Frankish empire. Tradition holds that Charlemagne granted a charter to the Andorran people in return for fighting the Moors. In the 9th century, Charlemagne's grandson, Charles the Bald, named the Count of Urgell as overlord of Andorra. A descendant of the count later gave the lands to the Diocese of Urgell.

In the 11th century, fearing military action by neighboring lords, the Bishop of Urgell placed himself under the protection of the Lord of Caboet, a nobleman. Later, the Count of Foix became heir to the Lord of Caboet through marriage to Ermessenda de Castellbò in 1208, and a dispute arose between the Occitan Count and the Catalan bishop over Andorra.

In 1278, the conflict was resolved by the signing of a pareage (pariatges) promoted by the sovereign of these land, the king of Aragon and count of Barcelona Peter III, which provided that Andorra's lordship be shared between the Count of Foix and the Bishop of La Seu d'Urgell (Catalonia). The pareage, a feudal institution recognizing the principle of equality of rights shared by two rulers, gave the small state its territory and political form. Andorra's borders have remained unchanged since 1278.

Andorra was briefly confiscated by the Crown of Aragon twice, in 1396 and 1512.

With the passage of time, the co-title to Andorra passed to the kings of Navarre. After Henry III of Navarre became king of France as Henry IV, he issued an edict in 1607 that established the head of the French state and the bishop of Urgell as co-lords of Andorra. From the last quarter of the 17th century onwards, as political ties with the Principality of Catalonia and the Monarchy of Spain progressively weakened, the co-lords began to be referred and act as "co-princes" (sovereigns), a political arrangement that still holds.

In both the Reapers' War and the War of the Spanish Succession, the Andorran people (while professing to be neutral) supported the rest of Catalans who saw most of their rights abolished in 1716. In order to avoid the application of the Nueva Planta decrees to Andorra, the Bishop of Urgell, Simeón de Guinda, convinced the new Spanish Bourbon authorities that the Valleys of Andorra had always been neutral and unrelated to the Principality of Catalonia, resulting in the definitive political separation of Andorra from Catalonia. Another direct reaction to the events was the promotion of Catalan writings in Andorra, with cultural works such as the Book of Privileges (Llibre de Privilegis de 1674), Manual Digest (1748) by Antoni Fiter i Rossell or the Polità andorrà (1763) by Antoni Puig.

=== 19th century ===
After the French Revolution, Napoleon I reestablished the Co-Principate in 1809 and removed the French medieval title. In 1812–1813, the First French Empire annexed Catalonia during the Peninsular War (Guerra Peninsular) and divided the region into four departements, with Andorra as a part of the district of Puigcerdà in the new department of Sègre. In 1814, an imperial decree reestablished the independence and economy of Andorra.

== 20th and 21st centuries ==
Andorra did not officially participate in World War I, although there were three Andorran volunteers who fought: Valentí Naudi, Josep Estany and René Huguet. North American newspapers in 1958 claimed that Andorra had declared war on Germany in 1914 but failed to sign a peace treaty until 1958, and this claim has appeared in later sources, but there appears to be no contemporary evidence of such declaration. In 2014, the news outlet Ràdio i Televisió d'Andorra investigated the 1958 claim and could find no documentation of any original declaration of war. Historian Pere Cavero could only find an exchange of letters between the German consul in Marseille and the Catalan Ombudsman, where the former asks if there is a state of war with Andorra and the latter responds they could find nothing in their archive to indicate this.

In 1933, France occupied Andorra as a result of social unrest before elections. On 12 July 1934 an adventurer named Boris Skossyreff issued a proclamation in Urgel, declaring himself Boris I, sovereign prince of Andorra, while simultaneously declaring war on the Bishop of Urgell. He was arrested by Spanish authorities on 20 July and ultimately expelled from Spain. From 1936 to 1940, a French detachment was garrisoned in Andorra to prevent encroachment as a result of the Spanish Civil War and Francoist Spain.

During World War II, Andorra remained neutral and was an important smuggling route from Spain into France. The French Resistance used Andorra as part of their route to get downed airmen out of France.

In 1943, Andorra carried out its first execution since the 19th century: Pere Areny was executed for the fratricide of his 56-year-old brother Antoni. He was put to death by firing squad in a public square of Canillo.

Long an impoverished land with little contact with any nations other than adjoining France and Spain, Andorra, after World War II, achieved considerable prosperity through a developing tourist industry. That development, abetted by improvements in transport and communications, has tended to break down Andorra's isolation and to bring Andorrans into the mainstream of European history. Public demands for democratic reforms led to the extension of the franchise to women in the 1970s and to the creation of new and more fully autonomous organs of government in the early 1980s.

=== Since the 1990s ===
Andorra formally became a parliamentary democracy in May 1993 following approval of a new constitution by a popular referendum in March 1993. The new constitution retained the French and Spanish co-princes although with reduced and narrowly defined powers. Civil rights were greatly expanded, including the legalisation of political parties and the provision for an independent judiciary.

Andorra joined a customs union with the European Communities (now the European Union) in 1991 and was admitted to the United Nations on 28 July 1993. It became a member of the Council of Europe in 1994. Andorra opened diplomatic relations with other countries such as the United Kingdom in 1994 and the United States in 1995.

The country has been seeking ways to improve its export potential and increase its economic ties with its European neighbours. The financial services sector of the economy is highly important because of Andorra's status as a tax haven and its banking secrecy laws.

== See also ==
- List of Co-Princes of Andorra
- History of Europe
- History of Catalonia
- History of France
- History of Spain
