= Joan Enric Vives i Sicília =

Co-Prince of Andorra from 2003 to 2025

The Most Reverend Archbishop Joan-Enric Vives
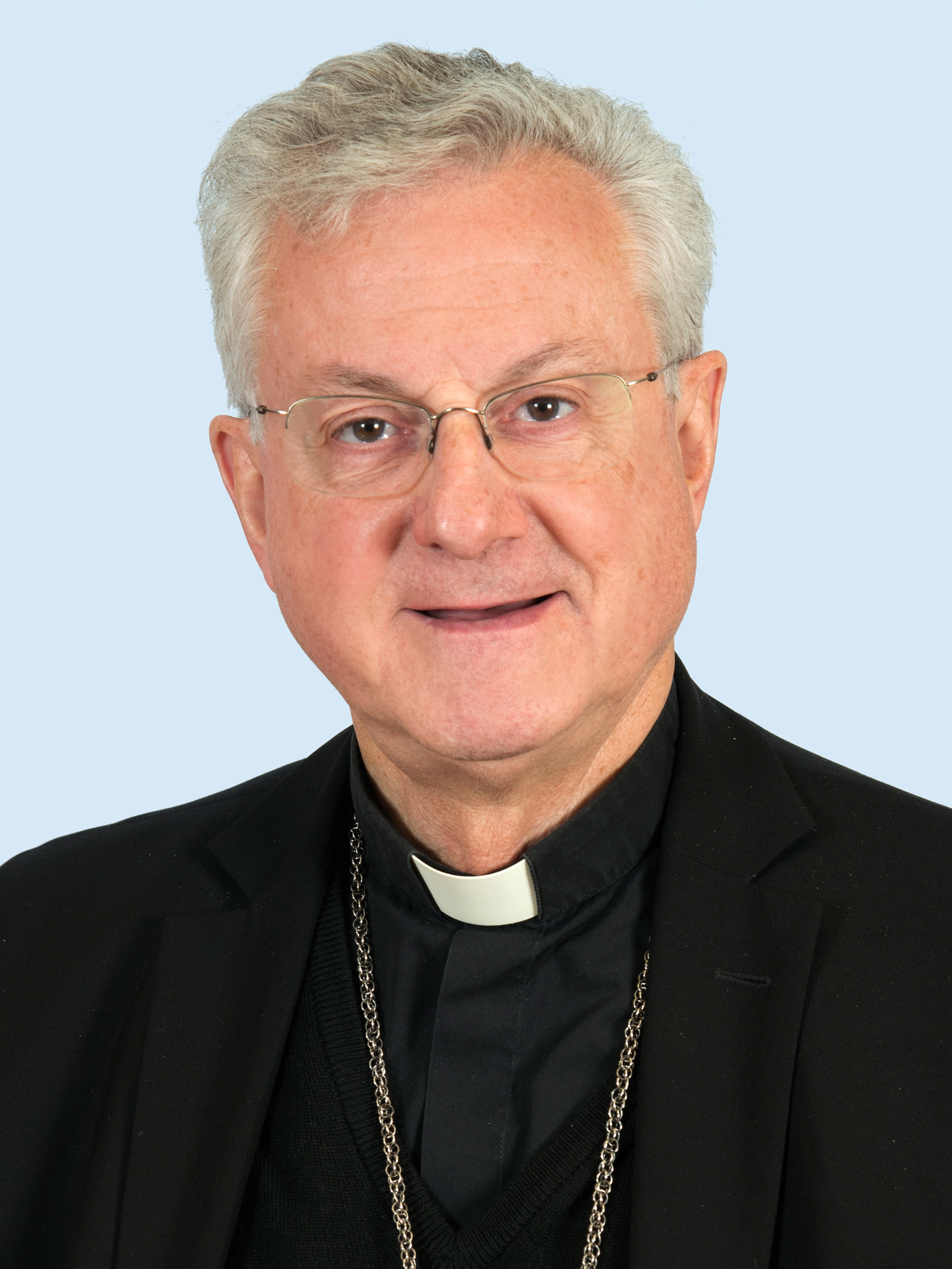
- Vives in 2022

Co-Prince of Andorra
- Reign: 12 May 2003 – 31 May 2025
- Predecessor: Joan Martí i Alanis
- Successor: Josep-Lluís Serrano Pentinat
- Co-Prince: Jacques Chirac (until 2007); Nicolas Sarkozy (2007–2012); François Hollande (2012–2017); Emmanuel Macron (2017–2025)
- Bishop of Urgell
- See: Urgell
- Appointed: 25 June 2001 (Coadjutor)
- Installed: 12 May 2003
- Term ended: 31 May 2025
- Predecessor: Joan Martí i Alanis
- Successor: Josep-Lluís Serrano Pentinat
- Previous posts: Coadjutor Bishop of Urgell (2001–2003); Auxiliary Bishop of Barcelona (1993–2001); Titular Bishop of Nona (1993–2001)

Orders
- Ordination: 24 September 1974
- Consecration: 5 September 1993 by Ricardo María Carles Gordó
- Rank: Archbishop ad personam

Personal details
- Born: 24 July 1949 (age 76) Barcelona, Spain
- Denomination: Roman Catholic Church
- Parents: Cornèlia Sicília Ibáñez; Francesc Vives i Pons
- Motto: Parare vias Domini
- Coat of arms

Joan-Enric Vives i Sicília (Catalan: [ʒuˈan ənˈriɡ ˈbiβəz i siˈsili.ə]; born 24 July 1949) is a Spanish Catholic prelate who served as Bishop of Urgell and ex officio episcopal Co-Prince of Andorra from 2003 to 2025.

== Biography ==
Vives i Sicília was born on 24 July 1949 in Barcelona, the third son of Francesc Vives i Pons and Cornèlia Sicília Ibáñez, who were small retailers. He entered the seminary in 1965 and studied humanities, philosophy and theology. In 1974, Vives was ordained a priest in his native parish of Santa Maria del Taulat de Barcelona.

On 9 June 1993 he was appointed auxiliary bishop of Barcelona and titular bishop of Nona. He received his episcopal consecration on 5 September from Ricardo María Carles Gordó, Archbishop of Barcelona. Pope John Paul II named him coadjutor bishop of Urgell on 25 June 2001. Upon the retirement of his predecessor Joan Martí Alanis on 12 May 2003, Vives succeeded as Bishop of Urgell and co-prince of Andorra. On 10 July 2003, he took the Constitutional Oath as Co-Prince of Andorra at Casa de la Vall, Andorra la Vella. Vives i Sicília was given the personal title of archbishop by Pope Benedict XVI on 19 March 2010.

On 12 July 2024, shortly before Vives reached the age of 75 when he was required to submit his resignation, Pope Francis named Josep-Lluís Serrano Pentinat as coadjutor bishop of Urgell, to succeed Vives when his resignation is accepted.

Vives, in his capacity as co-prince, officially opened the 2025 Games of the Small States of Europe in Andorra on 27 May 2025. On 31 May 2025, Pope Leo XIV accepted the resignation of Vives, ending his term as both Bishop of Urgell and as the co-prince of Andorra.

== Honours ==
- Andorra:
  - Cross of the Seven Arms (10 July 2024).
- Portugal:
  - Grand Cross of the Order of Christ (5 March 2010).
  - Grand Collar of the Order of Prince Henry (14 October 2024).

Catholic Church titles
Preceded by Agustín García-Gasco Vicente	Titular Bishop of Nona; 1993–2001	Succeeded by Socrates Villegas
Preceded by Joan Martí i Alanis	Bishop of Urgell; 2003–2025	Succeeded by Josep-Lluís Serrano Pentinat
Regnal titles
Preceded by Joan Martí i Alanis	Co-Prince of Andorra; 2003–2025; Served alongside: Jacques Chirac, Nicolas Sarkozy, François Hollande, Emmanuel Macron	Succeeded by Josep-Lluís Serrano Pentinat
