= Rafael Ramírez (politician) =

Venezuelan politician (born 1963)

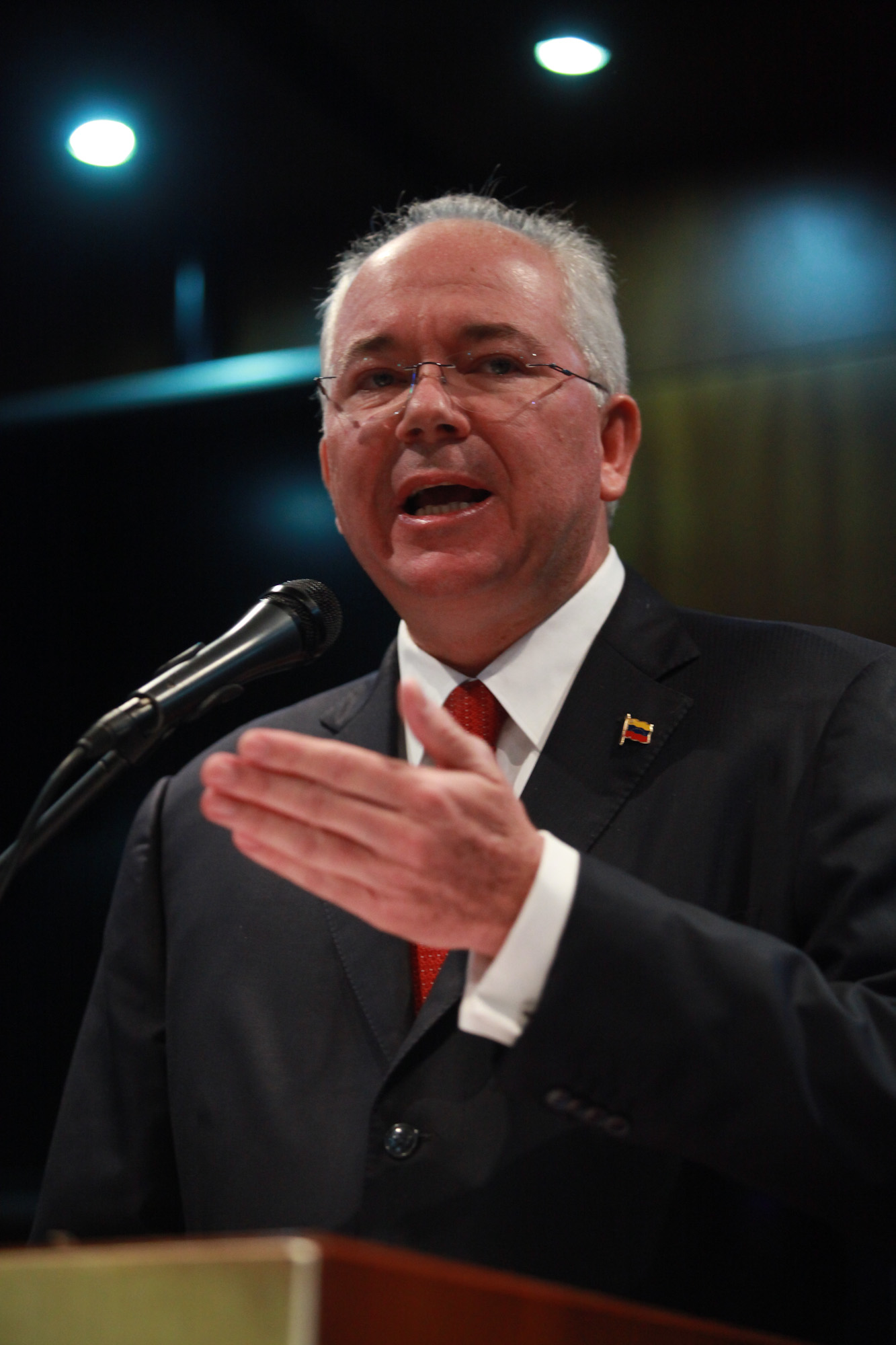
- Rafael Ramirez in 2013.

Permanent Representative of Venezuela to the United Nations
- In office 28 December 2014 – 28 November 2017
- Preceded by: Samuel Moncada
- Succeeded by: Samuel Moncada

Minister of Foreign Affairs of Venezuela
- In office 2 September 2014 – 25 December 2014
- President: Nicolás Maduro
- Preceded by: Elías Jaua
- Succeeded by: Delcy Rodríguez

President of PDVSA
- In office 20 November 2004 – 1 September 2014
- Preceded by: Alí Rodríguez
- Succeeded by: Eulogio del Pino

Personal details
- Born: 4 August 1963 (age 63) Pampán, Trujillo State Venezuela
- Party: United Socialist Party of Venezuela (PSUV) (2007–2017); Independent (2017–present)
- Parent: Rafael Darío Ramirez Coronado
- Relatives: Diego Salazar Carreño, Fidel Ramirez Carreño
- Education: Central University of Venezuela (MEng); University of Los Andes (BE)
- Occupation: Engineer, politician
- Salary: USD 30,000 (Last known in 2008)

Rafael Darío Ramírez Carreño (born August 4, 1963) is a Venezuelan engineer, politician, and diplomat. He joined the board of Venezuelan state-owned petroleum company PDVSA in 2002 and served as company president from 2004 to 2014. He also served as Venezuela's Minister of Energy from 2002 to 2014. He was the longest-serving cabinet member under President Hugo Chávez. In 2014, he briefly served as Minister of Foreign Affairs, and then subsequently served as Venezuela's Permanent Representative to the United Nations in New York. Ramirez was fired as UN representative by Venezuelan president Nicolas Maduro the evening of November 28, 2017. He confirmed he had "resigned" at the request of Maduro on December 4, 2017.

== Life and career ==
Ramírez was appointed to lead the energy ministry in July 2002 by Venezuelan President Chávez. Ramirez had been the founding president of Venezuela's "Enagas", the national regulatory agency that was set up to be responsible for establishing the national plan for natural gas production and distribution. Ramírez, a mechanical engineer by his university education, has had wide-ranging experience in the design, development, coordination, and management of engineering projects for the Venezuelan petroleum industry.

Hence, Ramírez was responsible for the design, development, and promotion of national policies for natural gas. Next, he was promoted to the status of Minister of Energy and Mines, and faced the "oil sabotage" of late 2002 and early 2003. The Ministry of Energy and Mines first became Ministry of Energy and Oil in January 2005, and then Ministry for People's Power of Oil and Mining in 2012. On November 20, 2004, Ramírez was selected as the president of the company Petróleos de Venezuela, S.A. (PDVSA), a position that he has held concurrently with that of the Minister of Energy and Petroleum.

Ramírez was moved to the post of Minister of Foreign Affairs on 2 September 2014. After a few months he was instead appointed as Permanent Representative to the United Nations on 26 December 2014. His appointment as Permanent Representative coincided with Venezuela taking a seat on the United Nations Security Council on 1 January 2015. On 31 May 2017, Ramírez was elected as Chair of the Fourth Committee (Special Political and Decolonization). On November 28, 2017 after weeks of differences with Venezuela's government, Ramirez was fired as Venezuela's Permanent Representative to the United Nations in New York. After a week of silence from Ramirez and the Venezuelan UN Mission, on December 4, 2017 he confirmed that he had resigned from the UN post at the request of the Venezuelan president.

== Professional career ==
- Mechanical engineer from Universidad de los Andes (ULA).
- Master's degree in energy from Universidad Central de Venezuela (UCV).

== Sanctions ==
The Government of Canada sanctioned Ramírez in November 2017 as being someone who participated in "significant acts of corruption or who have been involved in serious violations of human rights".

He is not banned anymore from entering neighboring Colombia after President Petro reestablished diplomatic relations with Venezuela after taking office in August 2022. The Colombian government maintained during Duque's government a list of people banned from entering Colombia or subject to expulsion; as of January 2019, the list had 200 people with a "close relationship and support for the Nicolás Maduro regime".

== Corruption allegations ==
In 2017, the Venezuelan Public Ministry linked Ramírez to the Andorra case. On 25 January 2018, Attorney General Tarek William Saab announced that an arrest warrant would be requested against him. Ramírez currently writes weekly articles on Aporrea. In July 2021, the Supreme Tribunal of Justice requested his extradition for corruption, embezzlement, violation of procurement rules, and criminal association.

=== Administradora Atlantic case ===
According to Transparencia Venezuela, the "Atlantic case" involved an embezzlement of about US$5 billion from PDVSA during Ramírez's administration. The scheme was first revealed by the U.S. Attorney's Office for the Southern District of Florida in March 2018. In April 2019, Swiss authorities reported on a "loan agreement" between PDVSA and shell companies in which bolívares were borrowed locally and repaid in U.S. dollars at a favorable state-set exchange rate.

On 29 February 2012, Administradora Atlantic 17107, owned by Juan Andrés Wallis Brandt, offered PDVSA financing for 17.49 billion bolívares. On 6 March 2012, Ramírez approved the proposal during a shareholders' meeting, leading to large payments in U.S. dollars.

In August 2022, Minister Tareck El Aissami presented a financing contract as evidence of a US$4.85 billion embezzlement during Ramírez's presidency of PDVSA, involving 28 payments between March 2012 and March 2013. The case implicated Luis and Ignacio Oberto Anselmi and businessman Alejandro Betancourt López. Former PDVSA vice president of finance Víctor Aular was arrested, though his case was dismissed in November 2022 by Judge Mascimino Márquez García, who ruled that the operation did not constitute a crime because it was denominated in U.S. dollars before currency controls were enacted.

Aular also gave testimony linking Ramírez, his cousin Diego Salazar Carreño, and his brother-in-law Baldo Sansó to corruption schemes. Judge Márquez García himself was later arrested for corruption in March 2023.

=== Banca Privada d'Andorra ===
In 2010, the Andorran judiciary investigated a money laundering case in the Banca Privada d'Andorra. According to Venezuelan prosecutors, at least 16 senior officials of PDVSA and the Petroleum Ministry were implicated, including Ramírez's cousin Diego Salazar Carreño, his wife Rosycela Díaz, and former vice-presidents Nervis Villalobos and Javier Alvarado Ochoa. Accounts belonging to Venezuelan officials were frozen in 2012 at the request of Andorran and U.S. authorities but were unfrozen in May 2013 by Judge Anna Estragués for lack of evidence, allowing withdrawals.

=== Banco Espírito Santo case ===
In April 2023, economist Orlando Ochea Terán published an investigation in El Nacional alleging that Ramírez and Asdrúbal Chávez orchestrated the diversion of US$5.73 billion in "Republic Bonds" from international oil companies into an encrypted account at Banco Espírito Santo in Madeira.

=== Drillship contracts ===
In 2010, PDVSA contracted three offshore drillships from Petrosaudi, including the Petrosaudi Songa, built in 1983 but presented as new. The seven-year lease exceeded US$1.175 billion and was payable regardless of operation. Additional drillships, the Petrosaudi Discover (built 1977) and Petrosaudi Saturn (built 1983), cost over US$1.1 billion. Critics described the contracts as involving obsolete vessels and causing patrimonial damage to Venezuela.

=== Associates and relatives ===
- Diego Salazar Carreño, cousin, arrested in 2017 and accused of money laundering of €1.3 billion in the Andorra case.
- Beatrice Daniela Sansó de Ramírez, wife and lawyer, former general manager of PDVSA La Estancia.
- Hildegard Rondón de Sansó, mother-in-law, former magistrate and PDVSA adviser.
- Luis Mariano Rodríguez Cabello, cousin of Diosdado Cabello, alleged operator in the Andorra scheme, extradited from Spain.
- José Enrique Luongo Rotundo, cousin, detained in 2017.
- Luis Carlos de León Pérez, former finance director of Electricidad de Caracas, extradited to the U.S. and convicted of money laundering.
- Rafael Ernesto Reiter Muñoz, former PDVSA security director, extradited from Spain, implicated in the 2007 "suitcase scandal".
- Víctor Eduardo Aular Blanco, PDVSA finance VP (2011–2014).
- César David Rincón Godoy, former Bariven manager, extradited to the U.S. and convicted of money laundering.
- Julia Elba Van Den Brule Aular, cousin of Víctor Aular, legal advisor and founder of PDVSA Ibérica in Spain.
- Lisbeth Margarita Cuauro Casanova, PDVSA director, accused of hiding €6.4 million in Andorra with Julia Elba Van.
- Juan Andrés Wallis Brandt, president of Administradora Atlantic 17107.

== See also ==
- List of ministers of foreign affairs of Venezuela
- List of foreign ministers in 2014

Political offices
Preceded by Elías Jaua	188th Minister of Foreign Affairs of Venezuela; 2 September 2014 – 25 December 2014	Succeeded by Delcy Rodríguez
