= Canòlic Mingorance =

Andorran judge (born 1976)

Judge at the European Court of Human Rights
- Incumbent
- Assumed office 31 March 2025
- Nominated by: Government of Andorra
- Preceded by: Pere Pastor Vilanova

President of Tribunal de Corts
- In office 14 February 2024 – 31 March 2025
- Preceded by: Anna Estragués
- Succeeded by: Enric Anglada

Personal details
- Born: 9 March 1976 (age 50) Sant Julià de Lòria, Andorra
- Education: Pompeu Fabra University; University of Andorra

Canòlic Mingorance Cairat (born 9 March 1976) is an Andorran judge, first female judge at the European Court of Human Rights with respect to Andorra since 2025. She previously served as president of the Criminal Court of Appeal (Tribunal de Corts) between 2024 and 2025.

== Career ==
Mingorance was born on 9 March 1976 in Sant Julià de Lòria, Andorra. She graduated in law in 1998 at the Pompeu Fabra University, in Barcelona (Spain) and Andorran Law in 2001 at University of Andorra.

Between 2001 and 2015, she worked as an investigating judge (batlle), becoming an expert in socio-economic issues and organised crime between 2015 and 2018. Until 2018, she was the investigating judge in several cases in the high-profile trial against Banca Privada d'Andorra (BPA). One of them is Odebrecht case and prosecuted in 2018 two former ministers of Hugo Chávez's government for the looting of Petróleos de Venezuela through the BPA.

She began working with the Council of Europe in 2004 as a legal expert participating in the evaluations of the Moneyval Committee, as well as a member of the European Committee for Legal Co-operation between 2013 and 2015. She has also been a member of the Consultative Council of European Judges since 2016, serving on the Bureau since 2024.

In Andorra, Mingorance has been a magistrate since 14 September 2018 and president of the Criminal Court of Appeal (Tribunal de Corts) since 14 February 2024, succeeding Anna Estragués.

Between 2023 and 2025, she was a member of the National Bioethics Committee of Andorra and a professor of international cooperation and international justice in the master's degree programme in judicial studies at the University of Andorra. In 2024, she obtained a doctorate in law in that university.

In October 2024, alongside Saïda El Boudouhi and Patrícia Quillacq, Mingorance were named by the Government of Andorra the three candidate for judge of the European Court of Human Rights to succeed Pere Pastor Vilanova, whose term had ended. On 28 January 2025 Mingorance was elected by the Parliamentary Assembly of the Council of Europe, obtaining 144 of the 167 votes cast. She was sworn in on 31 March 2025. Enric Anglada succeeded her as president of the Tribunal de Corts that same day.
