= United Nations Ethics Office - Whistle Blower Protection =

The United Nations Ethics Office prescribes Whistle Blower Protection by the Secretariat's ST/SGB/2005/21. The Ethics Office has the authority to take preventive action against potential repercussions the whistle blower may receive.

By providing protection for staff who may otherwise be reluctant to come forward, the UN learns about and is able to respond to misconduct. This strengthens accountability and maintains the integrity of its operations and programmes.

Protection against retaliation applies to all staff members, interns and UN volunteers. Punishing consultants who report violations of UN rules and regulations is also prohibited.

== History ==
In May 2005, Secretary-General Kofi Annan appointed Christopher Burnham of Connecticut as U.N. Under Secretary-General for Management. Burnham "pointed out the need for reform in the UN, indicating an efficient whistle blowing policy to be a major element". Burnham established the first UN Ethics Office, and a new whistleblower protection policy that received independent recognition as the "gold standard".

In October 2013, Florin Postica and Ai Loan Nguyen-Kropp won a public hearing with a UN Judge ruling that "Two whistle-blowers exposed evidence-tampering by a top official within the UN office who is supposed to investigate corruption in the world body's operations and suffered retaliation for it".

In November 2014, Peter A. Gallo filed a lawsuit in the Manhattan Supreme Court against his supervisor that he was allegedly defamed, falsely accused of crimes and subjected to discipline, all in retaliation for charging his boss with misconduct.

The Director of the Ethics Office, Elia Yi Armstrong, was appointed in August 2015 by United Nations Secretary-General Ban Ki-moon.

In December 2016, it was reported that the UN was considering drafting proposals to further restrict the type of report that would be eligible for "Whistleblower" protection.

The United Nations Ethics office has been under scrutiny for its perceived oversight shortcomings, and investigative practices in relation to Whistleblowers.

== Protection clauses ==
Under ST/SGB/2005/21, any UN staff member is entitled to protection if they:

- Report misconduct, and do so

as soon as possible and not later than five years after they become aware of it,
report it in good faith, and
provide information or evidence to support a reasonable belief that misconduct has occurred.

- Co-operate (in good faith) with an investigation or audit.

The role of the Ethics Office is to conduct a preliminary investigation to determine if a prima facie case of retaliation exists.

== Notable whistleblowers ==
The most famous UN Whistleblower is James Wasserstrom, who reported corruption within the UN Mission in Kosovo.

More recent whistleblowers include Aicha Elbasri, Caroline Hunt-Matthes, Florin Postica, Ai Loan Nguyen-Kropp and Peter A. Gallo.
