= Wasserstrom =

Wasserstrom is an Ashkenazi Jewish surname composed out of the German words Wasser for "water" and Strom meaning "stream". Notable people with the surname include:

- James Wasserstrom, American diplomat
- Jeffrey Wasserstrom, American historian of modern China
