= List of banks in Andorra =

Andbank head office in Escaldes–Engordany

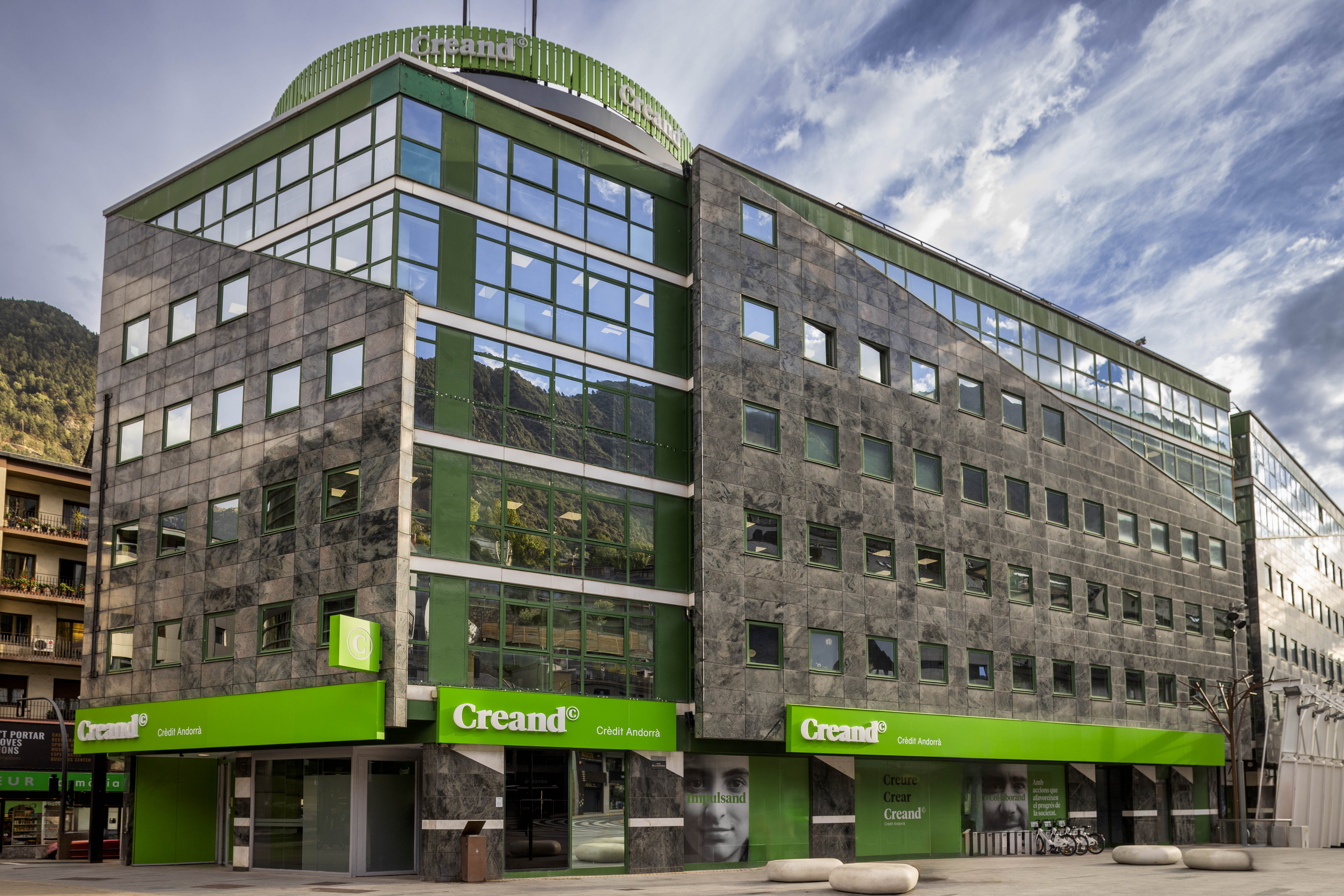
Creand head office in Andorra la Vella

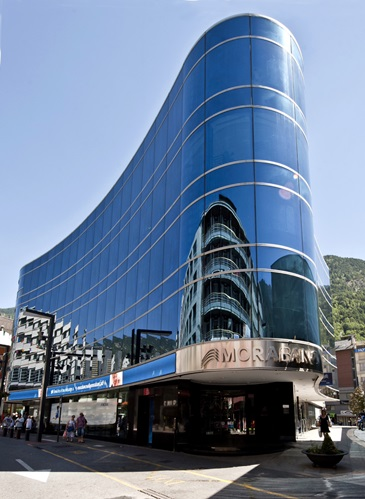
Mora Banc head office in Andorra la Vella

This is a list of banks in Andorra. As of June 2025, there were three banks in activity in Andorra:

- Andorra Banc Agrícol Reig SA, also known as Andbank
- Crèdit Andorrà SA, also known as Creand
- Mora Banc Grup SA

The other banks authorized in Andorra are:

- Banca Privada d'Andorra SA (BPA), in liquidation since 2015
- Banca Reig SA, absorbed by Andbank following merger into Banc Agrícol i Comercial d'Andorra in 2001
- BSA Banc SA, sponsored by Banco Sabadell and eventually absorbed by Mora Banc Grup in 2021
- Crèdit Capital Immobiliari SA (ex-Caixabank SA), absorbed by Creand
- Mora Banc SAU, absorbed by Mora Banc Grup
- Vall Banc SA, successor entity of BPA, absorbed by Creand in 2021

== Policy framework ==
Andorran banks are supervised by the Andorran Financial Authority. Since Andorra is not in the European Economic Area, EU banking law, regulation and supervision is not applicable to Andorran banks.

== See also ==
- List of banks in the euro area
- List of banks in Europe
