= Mingorance =

Mingorance is a surname. Notable people with the surname include:

- Canòlic Mingorance (born 1976), Andorran judge
- José Mingorance (1938–2026), Spanish footballer
