= Anna Estragués =

Andorran judge

President of Tribunal de Corts
- In office 17 May 2023 – 14 February 2024
- Preceded by: Josep Maria Pijuan
- Succeeded by: Canòlic Mingorance

Personal details
- Occupation: Judge

Anna Estragués Armengol is an Andorran judge, president of the Criminal Chamber of the Supreme Court of Andorra since 2024. She previously served as president of the Criminal Court of Appeal (Tribunal de Corts) between 2023 and 2024.

== Career ==
Shortly after completing her law degree and the passage of the 1993 Constitution, Estragués began working as a court clerk.

In 1999, Estragués became judge (batlle) working mainly on criminal prosecution. On 16 March 2012 was appointed justice of the Criminal Court of Appeal by the High Council of Justice of Andorra. Among the cases she has investigated, the money laundering of Petróleos de Venezuela through Banca Privada d'Andorra stands out. On 17 May 2023, Estragués was named president of that Court, replacing Josep Maria Pijuan, who was leaving the position due to retirement. On 14 February 2024 Estragués was succeeded as president by Canòlic Mingorance.

Estragués was appointed justice of the Supreme Court attached to the Criminal Chamber on 27 December 2023. On 28 March 2024, Estragués was named president of the Criminal Chamber, succeeding Yves Picod.
