= Núria Garcia Val =

Andorran lawyer, attorney and judge

President of Tribunal de Corts
- Incumbent
- Assumed office 21 October 2025
- Preceded by: Enric Anglada

Personal details
- Education: Université Savoie Mont Blanc; Grenoble Alpes University
- Occupation: Judge attorney

Núria Garcia Val is an Andorran lawyer, attorney and judge, president of the Tribunal de Corts (the Criminal Court of Appeal of Andorra) since 2025. She previously served as justice of the Superior Court of Justice.

== Career ==
Garcia Val graduated in law from the University of Savoie and holds a master's degree in European studies from the University of Grenoble. She began working as a lawyer in 2004 and as a court clerk in Andorra in 2011. The following year, in 2012, she became a judge (batlle) and worked in civil, juvenile, criminal, and preliminary investigation courts, and in 2016 she became a deputy prosecutor. In August 2022, the Superior Council of Justice renewed her position as deputy prosecutor for another six years.

On 9 April 2025 Garcia Val was sworn in justice of the Superior Court of Justice. Months later, on 21 October 2025, she was appointed president of the Tribunal de Corts by the Superior Council of Justice . Her appointment took effect that day, succeeding Enric Anglada, who retired.
