= Mora Banc Grup =

Mora Bank Group
- Company type: Sociedad Anónima
- Industry: Financial services
- Headquarters: Andorra la Vella, Andorra
- Products: retail banking, private banking, asset management
- Operating income: €49.66 million (2013)
- Net income: €34.5 million (2021)
- Total assets: €11.257 million (2021)
- Total equity: €352.44 million (2013)
- Number of employees: 377 (2021)
- Website: morabanc.ad

Banc Internacional d'Andorra - Banca Mora (BIBM or bibm) is the joint trading name of two Andorran banks, Banc Internacional d'Andorra and its wholly owned subsidiary Banca Mora. The two are known collectively as BIBM (styled bibm internally) or Inter-Mora. The consolidated bank accounts for just under 30% of Andorran domestic banking net assets and slightly over 30% of deposits.

Mora Banc Grup and Mora Banc, SAU operate together under the MoraBanc brand name and they present their financial statements and other data in a consolidated manner.

Mora Banc Grup, SA is the 2nd largest bank in Andorra in terms of total assets. In 2021 its total assets were 11.257 million EUR, providing the bank with the market share of 33.33%. In 2021 the bank's net income was 34.5 million EUR.

Mora Banc Grup, SA is rated by Fitch. Long-term credit rating assigned to the bank by Fitch is BBB− (good credit quality). Mora Banc Grup, SA participates in deposit guarantee scheme of Andorra. This scheme covers accounts up to 100 000 EUR per bank per depositor.

Mora Banc Grup, SA is headquartered in Andorra La Vella.

== See also ==
- List of banks in Andorra
