= Roberto Alemán Zubieta =

Panamanian lawyer, diplomat, politician, and businessman

Roberto Ramón "Chato" Alemán Zubieta (2 October 1921 – 18 July 2009) was a Panamanian lawyer, diplomat, politician and businessman. He served as Ambassador of Panama to the United States from 1968 to 1969.

In 1951, he married María Teresa Healy Quelquejeu (born 1928), who was a descendant of the wealthy de Roux family. Together they had six children, including the diplomat Jaime Eduardo (born 1953) and politician José Miguel (born 1958).

He was also founder of the firm Icaza, González Ruiz y Alemán and leader of the Liberal and Movimiento Liberal Republicano Nacionalista parties. He was a member of the National Council of Foreign Relations, special ambassador of Panama to the Government of the United States of America and member of the Commission for the Revision of the Political Constitution. Alemán Zubieta also served as president of Cervecería Nacional, S.A., Capitales Nacionales, S.A. and Industria Nacional de Plásticos, S.A., among other companies.

Alemán Zubieta died on 18 July 2009 at the age of 88 in Panama City, following a long illness.
