= José Miguel Alemán =

Panamanian politician

José Miguel Alemán Healy (born 8 May 1956, in Panama City) is a Panamanian Attorney, Politician and Businessman.

He spent a significant part of his childhood living in Washington, DC while his father, Roberto Alemán Zubieta, was serving as a lead negotiator of the Robles-Johnson Three in One Treaty project in 1968. Roberto Alemán Zubieta was appointed as Ambassador of the Republic of Panama in Washington, D.C., and served in that capacity until early 1970. His brother Jaime Alemán Healy, also served as Ambassador of the Republic of Panama under President Ricardo Martinelli, from 2009-2011.

José Miguel Alemán studied Politics and Government at Ripon College, Wisconsin, graduating with honors in 1978. He later attended Tulane University in New Orleans, LA. obtaining a Juris Doctor degree in 1981. He practiced law as an associate attorney at Icaza, Gonzalez-Ruiz & Aleman (1982-1987) and is a founding partner at Arias, Aleman & Mora (1987), where he spent most of his professional career. During this period, Mr. Aleman was also a founding Director of Multibank, Inc. (1989-2021), Director of Chagres Insurance Company (1996-2005), President of Multibank Insurance Company (2010-2020), President of Cafetalera Rio Cochea, S.A. (2005-2019). And since 2015, has served on the Board of Directors of Compañia Bella Vista de Finanzas, S.A.

José Miguel Aleman entered politics in 1983 as the organizer of the Panamenista Party and served as its legal coordinator from 1984 to 1990. He served under President Guillermo Endara as Undersecretary of Government & Justice (1991), and as Secretary of State (1999-2003) under President Mireya Moscoso. In this capacity, Mr. Aleman coordinated the final stages of the Panama Canal and transferred the reverted areas to the complete jurisdiction and administration of the Republic of Panama. In 2003, Mr. Aleman was designated by the Arnulfista Party's political convention as its candidate for the 2004 presidential election, which was won decisively by Martin Torrijos as a result of the split Arnulfista Party vote between former President Guillermo Endara and the official candidate Alemán. Mr. Aleman also served two stints in CONAREX, Panama's Council on Foreign Relations. In 2024, Mr. Aleman was appointed by President José Raul Mulino as Ambassador of the Republic of Panama to the United States of America, becoming the third member of his immediate family to hold this prestigious and important diplomatic post, representing the Republic of Panama.

Mr. Aleman has also been very active in thoroughbred racing in the Republic of Panama, winning multiple stakes, and achieving the leading owner award for money won on one occasion. He was instrumental in the negotiation and passage of the law that allocated a portion of slot machine taxes to horse racing purses. In 2015, he was elected to the Racing Hall of Fame of the Republic of Panama, under the Racing Personality Category.

In his personal life, Mr. Jose Miguel Aleman married Victoria Dutari Martinelli in 1983, their children are Miguel (1987) and Felipe Jose (1991).
