= Nàdia Alís =

Andorran judge

Judge of Tribunal de Corts
- Incumbent
- Assumed office 2 October 2025

Personal details
- Education: University of Montpellier; University of Andorra
- Occupation: Judge

Nàdia Alís Cirera is an Andorran judge. She has been judge of the Tribunal de Corts since 2025.

== Career ==
Alís studied law and history at the University of Montpellier and subsequently completed a postgraduate degree and specialised courses at the University of Andorra.

She has devoted her professional career to practising as a lawyer, court clerk, and after being deputy public prosecutor public, in 2016 Alís became judge, which later served particularly on civil matters. She was reappointed as a judge in 2022. Alís has also taught court officials and on the subject of gender-based violence, and has represented the Batllia d'Andorra at international organisations such as the Council of Europe.

She is the author of a teaching manual and has been a speaker at conferences on judicial cooperation, mediation and the prevence violence.

On 2 October 2025 she became judge of the Tribunal de Corts.
