= Alemán, Cordero, Galindo & Lee =

Panama law firm

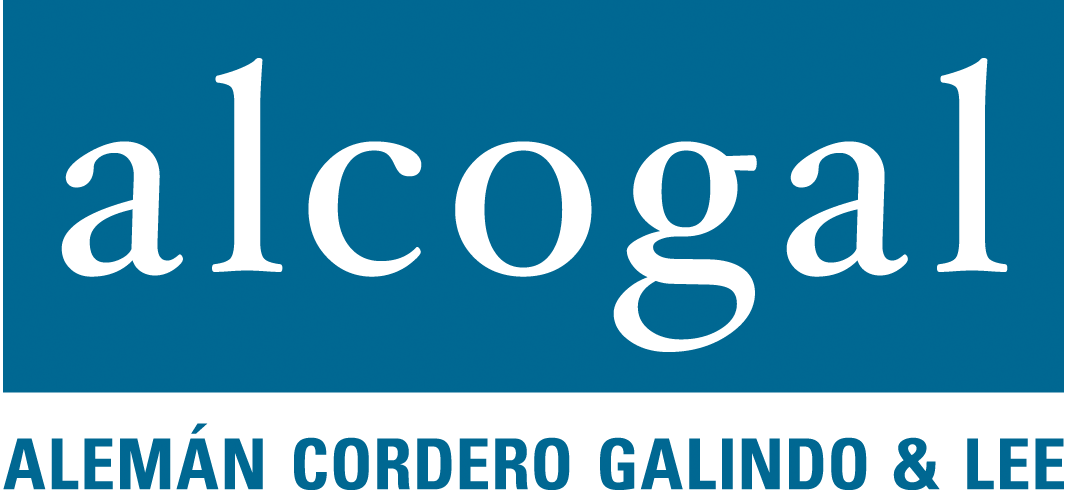
Logo of ALCOGAL

Alemán, Cordero, Galindo & Lee (commonly known by its abbreviation Alcogal) is a law firm based in Panama. Founded in 1985, the firm represents several multinational companies operating in Panama and was chosen as the Central American law firm of the year by Chambers Global in both 2007 and 2013. Jaime Alemán Healy is one of the founding partners. The firm has offices in several countries in addition to Panama, including jurisdictions such as The Bahamas, Belize, the British Virgin Islands, Hong Kong, Singapore, and Switzerland. The firm is affiliated with the international Meritas network.

The firm was named as one of the largest sources of leaked documents in the Pandora Papers scandal.

In 2021, Alcogal was reported to have incorporated around 200 companies in Panama and other jurisdictions for Banca Privada d'Andorra, a relatively unknown private bank based in Andorra, several of which were later used to transfer funds associated with political corruption in Venezuela. In 2015, when United States authorities accused the bank's managers of accepting exorbitant commissions to help clients launder $4.2 billion, Alcogal withdrew. The private bank's clients included former high-ranking officials of Venezuela's state-owned oil company Petróleos de Venezuela. Some of the Venezuelans involved in the scandal were also clients of Alcogal, for whom the firm had set up offshore companies. Alcogal subsequently resigned as the legal representative of these companies.

== Clientele ==
International clients of the law firm include Citibank, the US pharmaceutical company Pfizer and the Bank of Nova Scotia, as well as Credit Suisse. The firm has worked for a number of Central and South American banks as well, including Banco General (Panamá), Banistmo, Bancolombia, Banesco, St. George's Bank & Co., Caja de Ahorros, Banco Aliado, Credicorp Bank, and Banco Latinoamericano de Comercio Exterior (BLADEX).

Alcogal has also worked in the past with companies and individuals involved in large corruption networks, including the global bribery operation of Brazilian construction giant Odebrecht SA (now known as Novonor). Alcogal managed the shell company of Brazilian football official José María Marín, who was involved in the Fifagate international football corruption scandal. María Marín was later sentenced to prison for bribery.

According to the ICIJ, Alcogal also set up two companies for Juan Carlos Varela (former president of Panama, suspected by the press of having financed his election with money laundering funds, as well as for his brother, father and other relatives). Nasry Juan 'Tito' Asfura, a candidate for president of Honduras in 2021, also (in 2006) had a company called Karlane Overseas SA registered in Panama by Alcogal, whose 10,000 shares minus one were transferred in 2007 to Asfura. Jordan's King Abdullah, Czech Prime Minister Andrej Babis and Kenya's President Uhuru Kenyatta have also used the company's services, likely for tax shelter purposes.

Alcogal helped Gennady Timchenko, a Russian oligarch and close confidante of Vladimir Putin, set up a shell company.
