= Jaime Alemán =

Panamanian lawyer, businessman, and diplomat

- Born: Jaime Eduardo Alemán Healy; 14 November 1953 (age 73); Panama City, Panama
- Education: University of Notre Dame; Duke University School of Law
- Occupations: Lawyer, businessman, diplomat
- Employer: Alemán, Cordero, Galindo & Lee
- Spouse: María del Pilar Arosemena de Alemán
- Children: 3
- Father: Roberto Alemán Zubieta
- Relatives: José Miguel Alemán (brother)

Jaime Eduardo Alemán Healy (born 14 November 1953) is a Panamanian lawyer, businessman, world traveler, and diplomat. He served as Ambassador of Panama to the United States from August 11, 2009, to January 2, 2011, appointed by President Ricardo Martinelli Berrocal.

He is recognized for being the first person to complete the Grand Slam of Travel: visiting all 193 UN-recognized countries, the North Pole, the South Pole, and space.

== Biography ==
Alemán was born in 1953 in Panama City, Panama. He spent part of his childhood in Washington, D.C., where his father, Roberto Alemán Zubieta, served as a negotiator for the Robles-Johnson Treaties and later as Ambassador of Panama to the United States (1968–1969). His brother, José Miguel Alemán, is a Panamanian politician who ran for president in 2004. Alemán holds a Juris Doctor from Duke University School of Law (1978) and a B.A. in economics from the University of Notre Dame. He is an honorary member of Duke's School of Law Board of Visitors and received the International Alumni Achievement Award from the school in 2003.

== Career ==
Alemán is the managing partner of Alemán, Cordero, Galindo & Lee, a Panamanian law firm he founded in 1985.

For over two decades, Alemán has served on the boards of directors for entities including HSBC Bank Panama, Banistmo, Leasing Banistmo, Panamá Power Holdings, Fideicomiso Ena Norte, PKB Bank (Panama), and the Tag Bank.

Aleman has served as President of the International Lawyers Association of Panama; as a member of the board of directors of Special Olympics International; as a member of the board of the Panama chapter of Young Presidents Organization (YPO) and of the Consejo Empresarial de America Latina (CEAL); as a member of the Latin American board of advisors of the Woodrow Wilson Center and of the Stimson Center, both of which are based in Washington, D.C.; as a member of the Panama-based board of advisors of the Smithsonian Tropical Research Institute (STRI); and on the editorial board of La Estrella de Panama, the country’s oldest newspaper.

Alemán began his public career in 1978 as a legal advisor to the Inter-American Development Bank in Washington, D.C. He served as legal counselor to President Nicolás Ardito Barletta (1984–1985) and as Minister of Government and Justice under President Eric Arturo Delvalle (1988). In 1999, he was appointed to the Council of Foreign Affairs by President Mireya Moscoso. He served as Panama's Ambassador to the United States from August 2009 to January 2011 and was reappointed to the Council of Foreign Affairs by President Laurentino Cortizo in 2020.

Alemán published his autobiography, La Honestidad No Tiene Precio, in August 2014, Alrededor del mundo en 48 años in January 2022, and The Grand Slam of Travel in 2026.

== Personal life ==
Alemán is married to María del Pilar Arosemena de Alemán and has three children: Jaime Eduardo, Ana Sofía, and Juan Manuel, as well as six grandchildren.

== Exploration and travel milestones ==
Aleman has traveled to all 193 United Nations countries. On March 8th, 2020 the organization NomadMania recognized him for achieving this feat.

In January 2024, Alemán reached the South Pole on an expedition, and later in August 2024, he reached the North Pole, completing visits to both polar extremes of Earth. In May 2025, he flew aboard Blue Origin’s New Shepard NS-32 suborbital spaceflight, crossing the Kármán line and entering space. With these achievements — having visited all 193 United Nations member states, both the North Pole and South Pole, and traveling into space — he has earned the recognition of being the first person to complete a Grand Slam of Travel.

== Publications ==
- La honestidad no tiene precio. Autobiografía (Honesty Is Priceless. Autobiography), 2014.
- Alrededor del mundo en 48 años (Around the World in 48 Years), 2022.
- The Grand Slam of Travel, 2026.
