= Carolina Bailén =

Andorran judge and prosecutor

Judge of Tribunal de Corts
- Incumbent
- Assumed office 9 September 2020

Personal details
- Occupation: Judge

Carolina Bailén Vila is an Andorran prosecutor and judge. She has been judge of Tribunal de Corts since 2020.

== Career ==
Bailén has spent her professional career in the public prosecutor's office and served as a deputy public prosecutor in Andorra until 2020. In 2019 she won the open competition for a part-time post as a judge at the Tribunal de Corts, but her appointment was challenged by a fellow candidate, and her swearing-in had to be postponed until 9 September 2020, when the appeals alleging irregularities were resolved when the Constitutional Court of Andorra dismissed the appeal and lifted the suspension in July 2020. She became a full-time judge of the Tribunal de Corts in May 2023 to succeed Josep Maria Pijuan.
