= Université Savoie Mont Blanc =

University in France

University Savoie Mont Blanc
- Université Savoie Mont Blanc
- Other names: Université de Chambéry
- Type: Public
- Established: 1960s, officially-recognised 1979
- Budget: €112,805,192 (2018)
- President: Philippe Galez
- Academic staff: 727
- Total staff: 1338
- Students: 14,735 (2021–2022)
- Doctoral students: 244
- Location: Chambéry, Savoie, France
- Campus: Annecy, Haute-Savoie; Jacob-Bellecombette, Savoie Le Bourget-du-Lac, Savoie
- Website: https://www.univ-smb.fr

Université Savoie Mont Blanc (English: University Savoie Mont Blanc, a.k.a. USMB) is a public university in the Haute-Savoie and Savoie departments of France, with one campus in Annecy, Haute-Savoie and two near Chambéry, Savoie.

== Campuses ==
The university was officially founded in 1979 from several colleges founded in the 1960s and 1970s. To avoid a straight choice between the two biggest towns of the Savoie/Haute-Savoie departments, the authorities decided to set up a campus in each city for different areas of study. The university has three campuses:

- The Annecy campus is the university's "technology institute" (IUT), and teaches engineering-related subjects and business and administration related subjects. Here is located the faculty of economics and management (IMUS, Institut de Management de l'Université de Savoie).
- Jacob-Bellecombette (1.5 km south of Chambéry) is the campus for students of languages, literature, social sciences, law and economics. It has a library, sports hall and one cafeteria.
- The Technolac campus at Bourget-du-Lac (12 km north of Chambéry) teaches science.

In addition, the university's presidence and administrative buildings are located in Chambéry.

== History ==
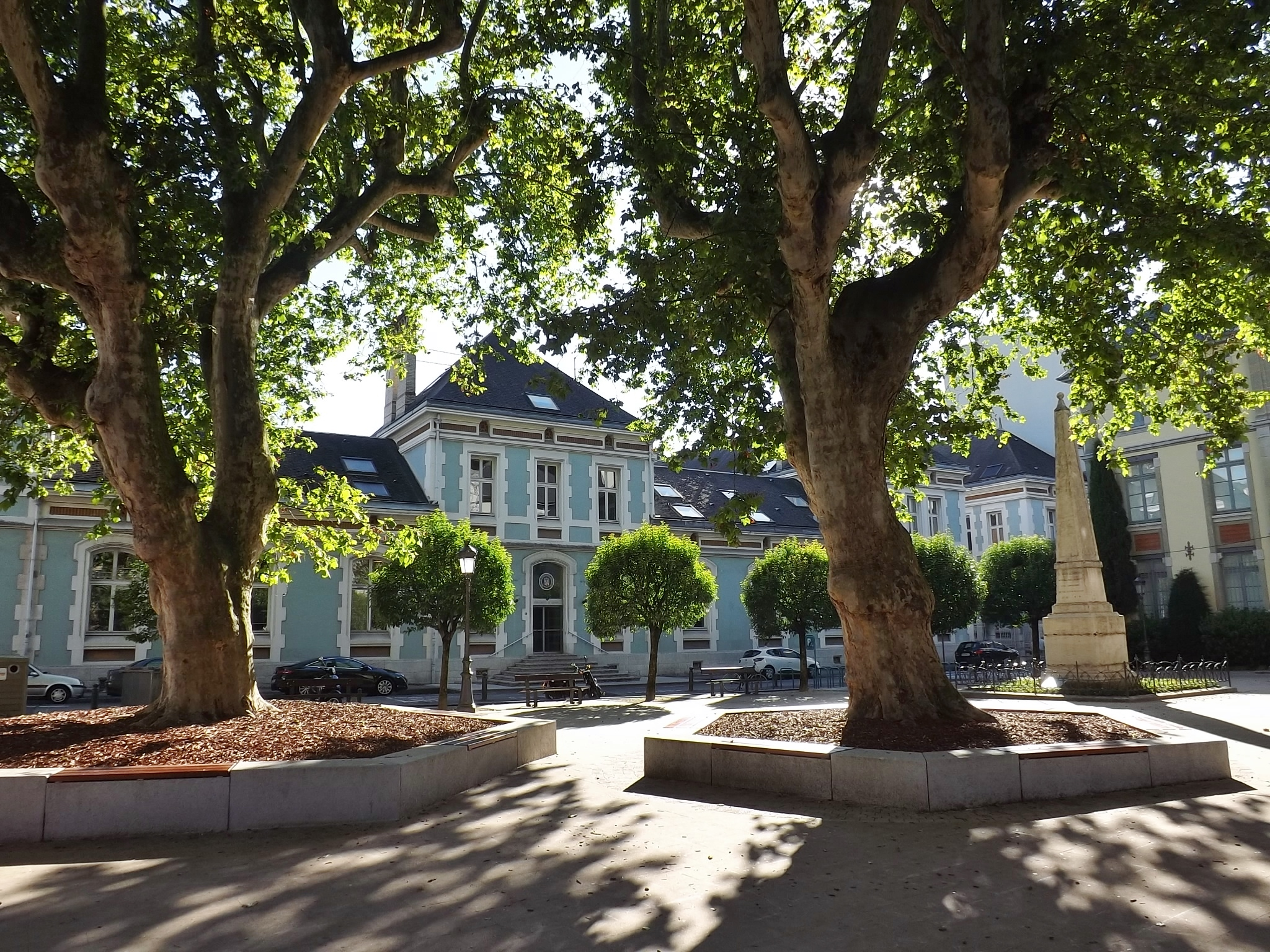
Head office in Chambéry

- Between 1295 and 1563, Chambéry was the capital of Savoy. The University of Turin was founded in 1404, and Chambéry was the home of an école préparatoire, a school preparing students to go there. But there was no university in Chambéry in this period, and Turin took over from Chambéry as Savoy's capital in 1563.
- The annexation of Savoy by France after the unification of Italy meant that Chambéry had an académie between 1860 and 1920, but not a university.
- During the movement creating new universities in the 1960s, a Savoy Collège Scientifique Universitaire (CSU) was created, then a Collège Littéraire Universitaire (CLU) in 1963. These colleges were merged, creating the Centre Universitaire de Savoie (CUS), at Chambéry, on 9 May 1969. In 1973, Annecy's technical and business college, the Institut Universitaire Technologique (IUT), was founded, and from 27 June 1979, the CUS was officially classed as a university. It was later renamed the Université de Savoie and then in May 2014 Université Savoie Mont Blanc

Historical Student Population
Year	Pop.	±%
1960	300	—
1973	1,684	+461.3%
1974	1,816	+7.8%
1975	2,119	+16.7%
1976	2,203	+4.0%
1977	2,347	+6.5%
1978	2,479	+5.6%
1979	2,532	+2.1%
1980	2,512	−0.8%
1981	2,520	+0.3%
1982	2,921	+15.9%
1983	3,250	+11.3%
1984	3,336	+2.6%
1986	4,139	+24.1%
1994	10,400	+151.3%
2000	12,101	+16.4%
2001	11,788	−2.6%
2002	12,087	+2.5%
2003	12,314	+1.9%
2004	12,080	−1.9%
2005	11,836	−2.0%
2006	11,493	−2.9%
2007	11,016	−4.2%
2008	10,983	−0.3%
2009	11,289	+2.8%
2010	11,650	+3.2%
2011	11,890	+2.1%
2012	12,478	+4.9%
2013	13,045	+4.5%
2016	14,107	+8.1%
2018	14,831	+5.1%
2021	15,376	+3.7%
2022	14,735	−4.2%

== Foreign students ==
After Paris I, Pantheon-Assas University and Strasbourg III, Savoy has the fourth-highest number of Erasmus exchange students in France. The school of international relations has signed 228 conventions with universities in 82 countries, and the university takes more than 1,000 foreign students per year overall.

== Gallery ==
=== Chambéry campus ===
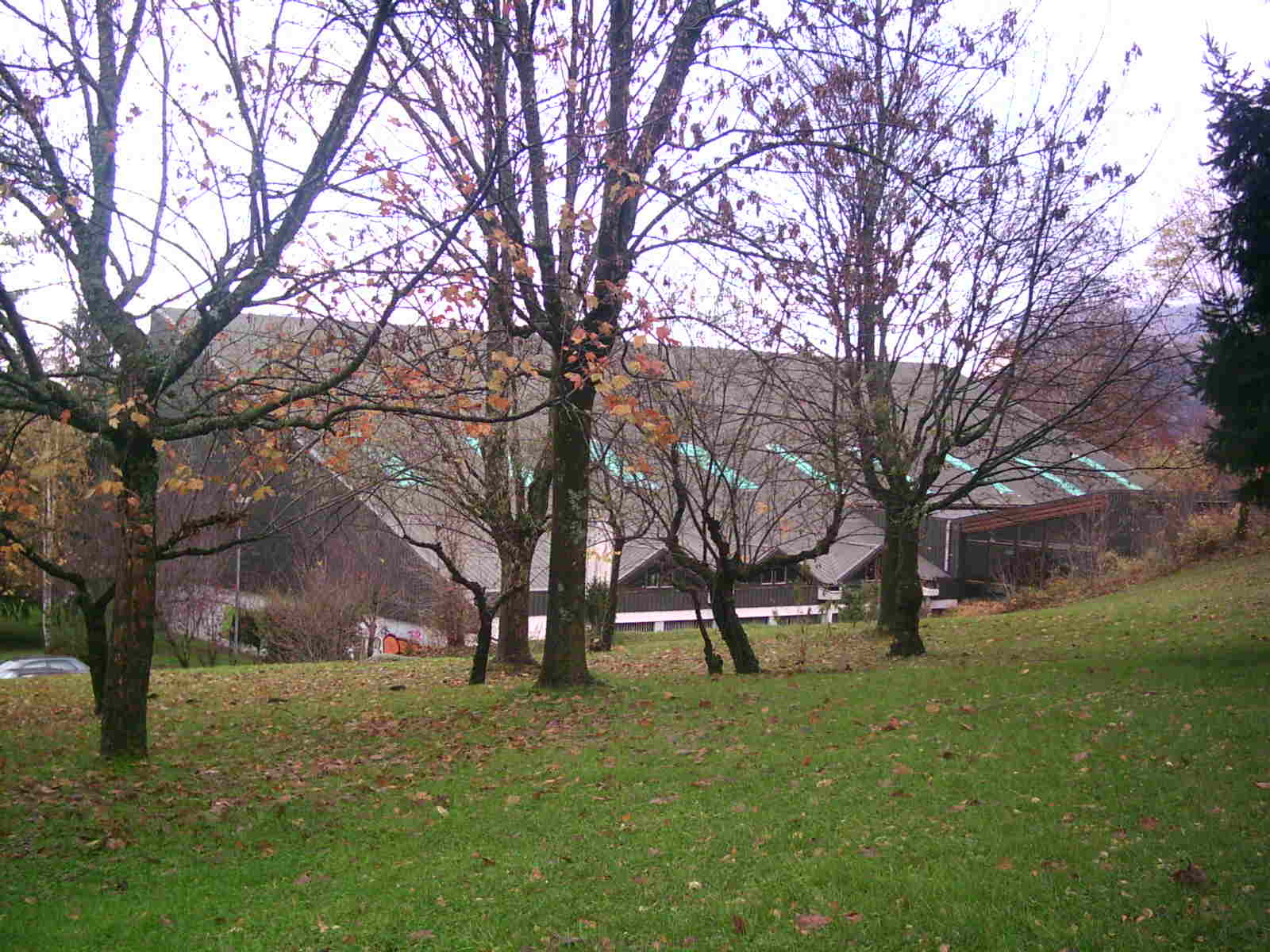
Sports hall

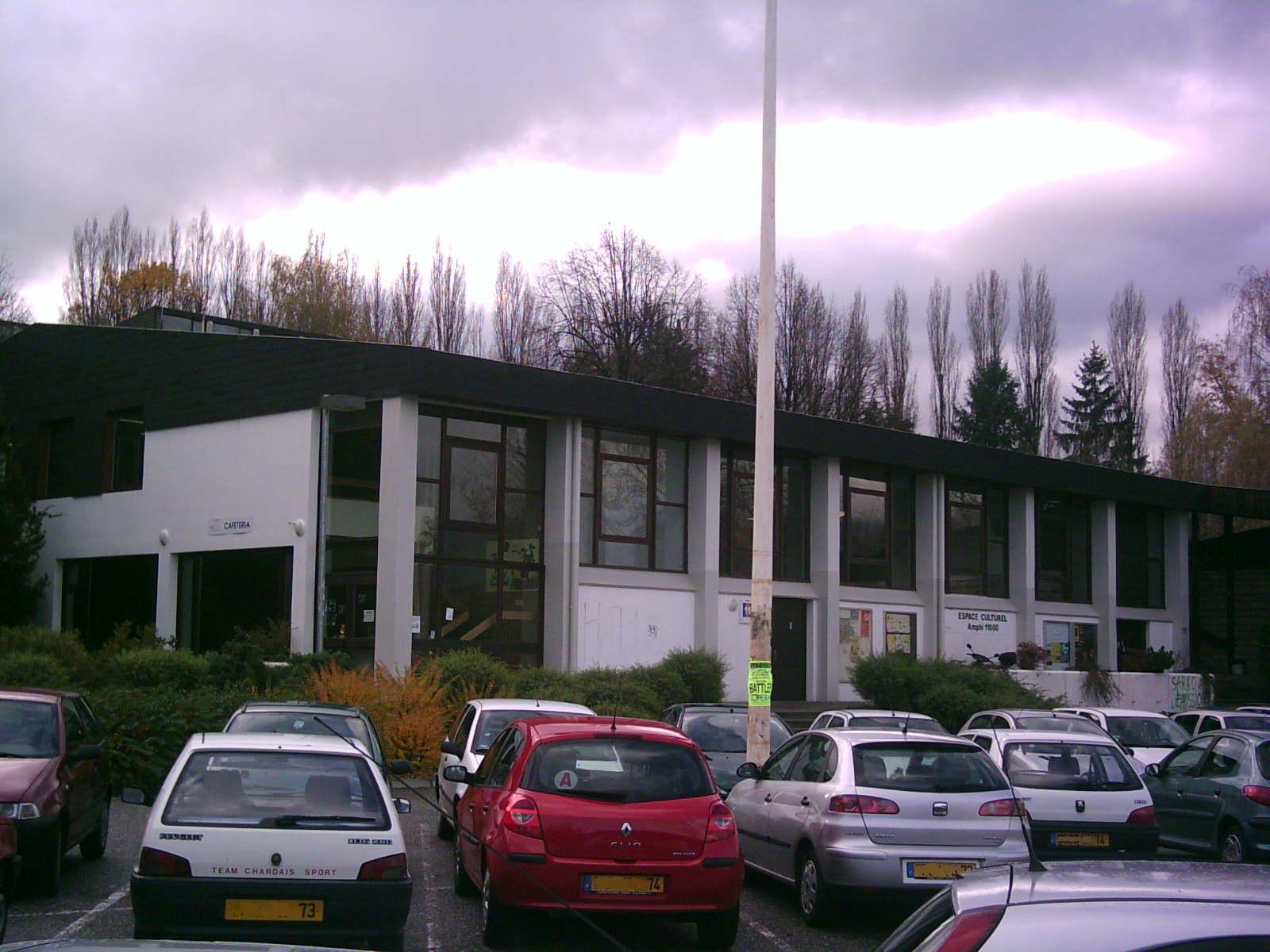
Grand amphithéâtre (lecture theatre)

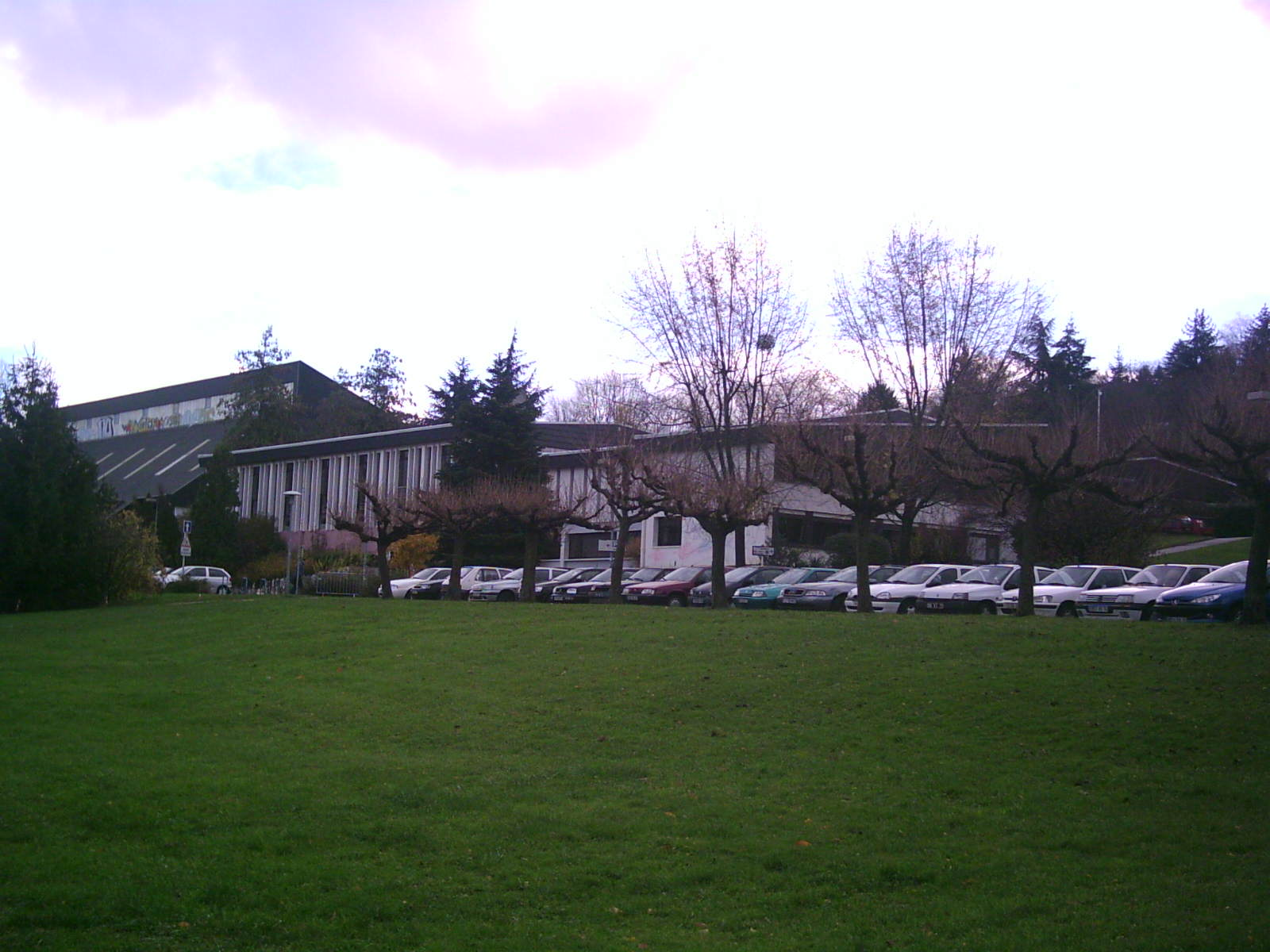
University library

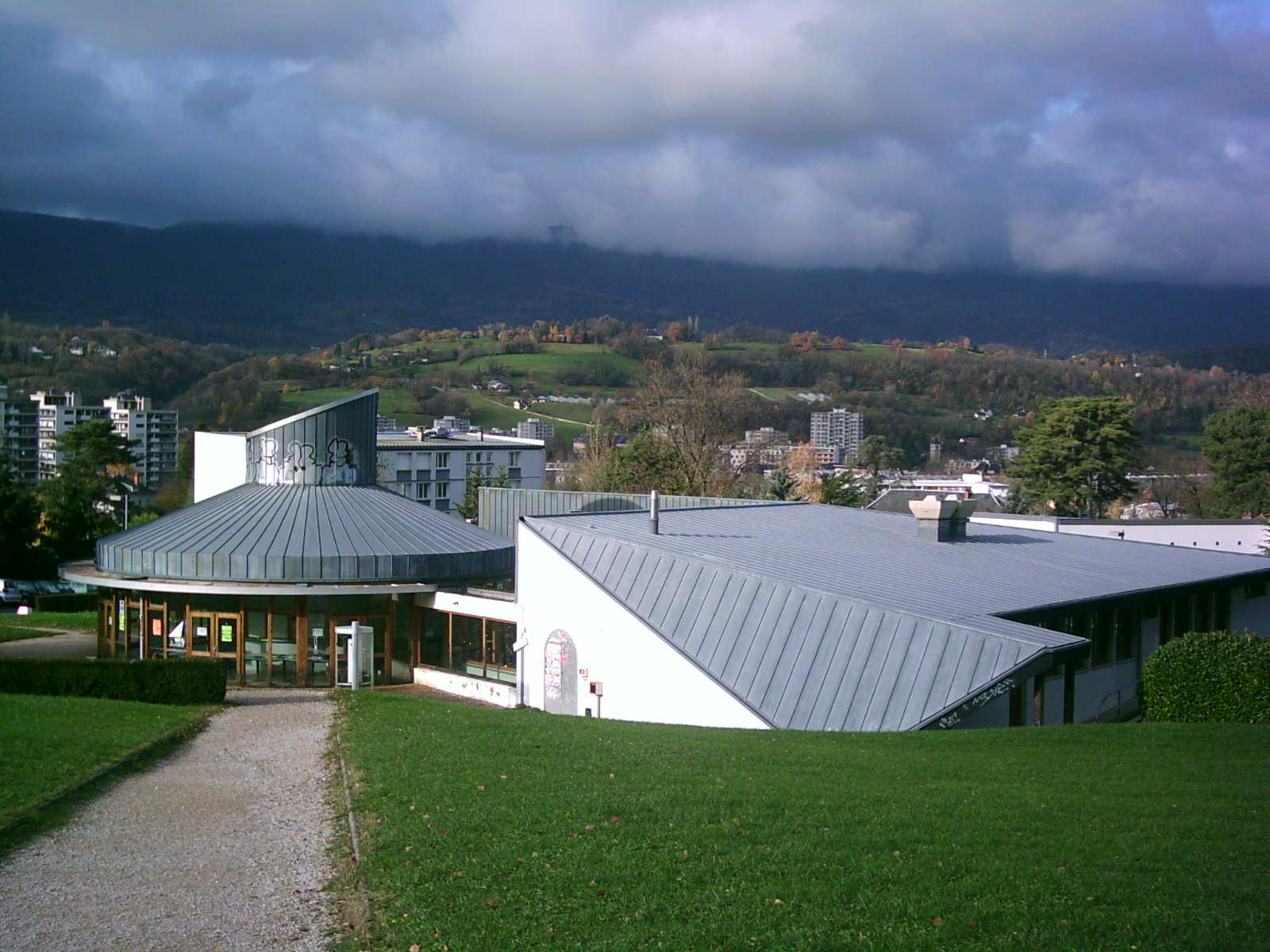
University restaurant, Le Satellite (burnt down in July 2008)

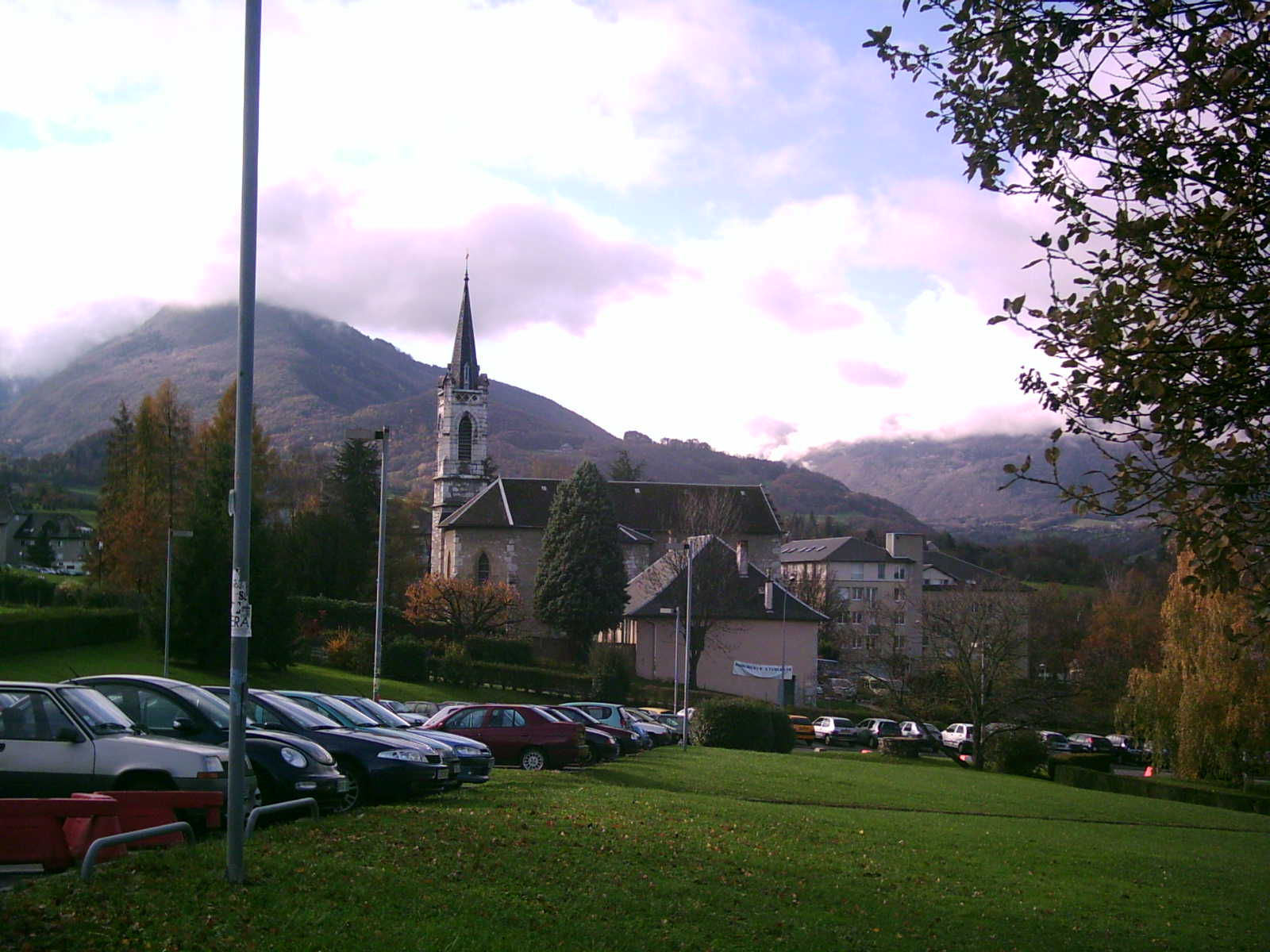
Church of Jacob-Bellecombette, next to campus

=== Annecy campus ===
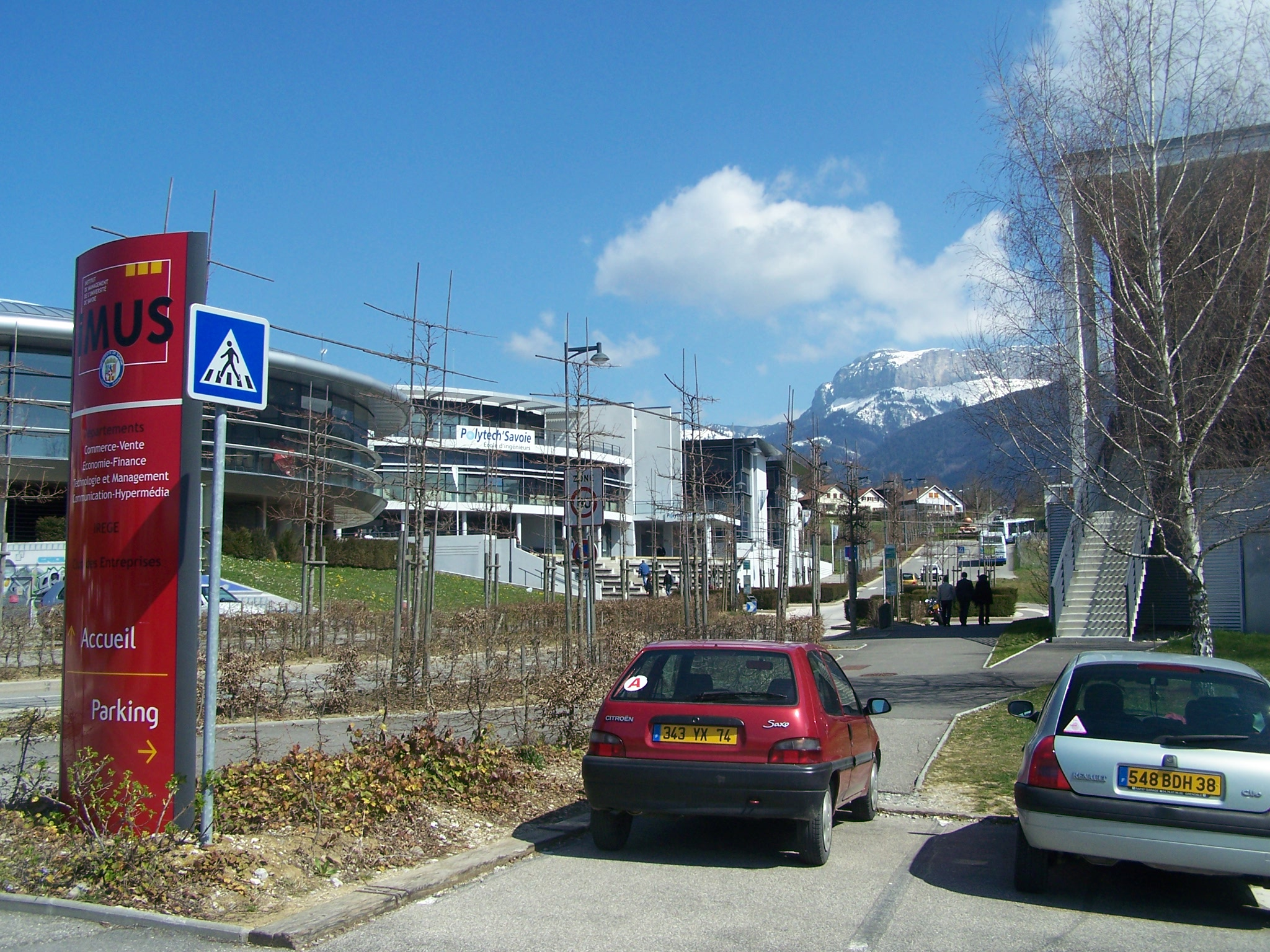
Campus

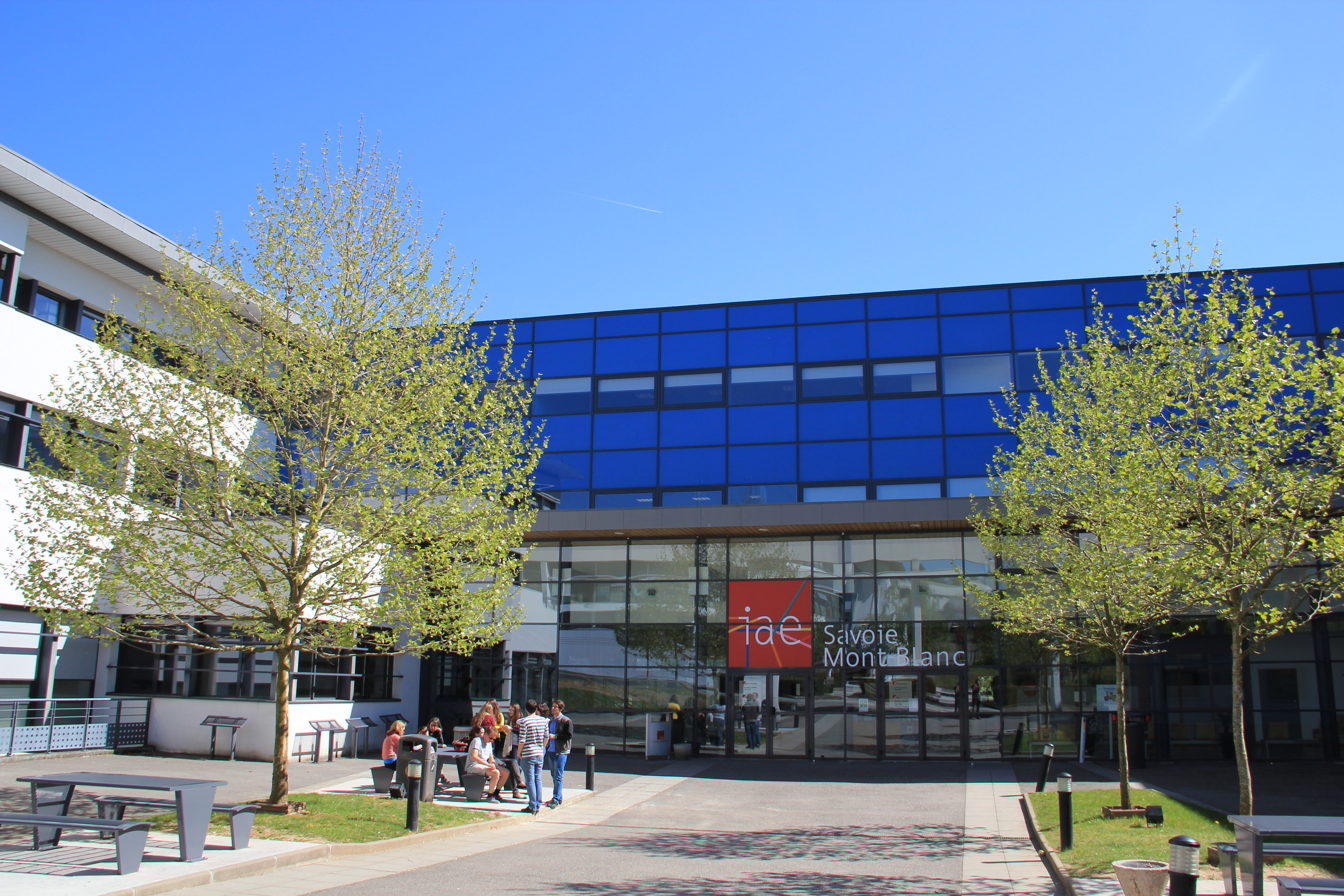
IAE Savoie Mont-Blanc

== Departments ==
=== Annecy ===
- IUT d'Annecy
  - Département Techniques de Commercialisation
  - Département Mesures Physiques
  - Département Génie Mécanique et Productique
  - Département Génie Électrique et Informatique Industrielle
  - Département Réseaux et Télécoms
- IAE Savoie Mont Blanc
- Polytech Annecy-Chambéry

=== Jacob-Bellecombette ===
- School of literature, languages and human sciences (LLSH)
- School of law and business
- IAE Savoie Mont Blanc

=== Bourget-du-Lac ===
- School of applied sciences
- IUT de Chambéry
- Polytech Annecy-Chambéry

== Notable people ==
=== Faculty ===
- Michel Soutif (1921 – 2016) - physicist and educator

=== Alumni ===
- Aicha Elbasri (born in Morocco) - writer and former United Nations official
- Surano (born 1955) - geophysicist and volcanologist from Indonesia
- Ulla Tørnæs (born 1962, in Esbjerg) - Danish politician
- Yang Lan (born 1968, Beijing) - media proprietor, journalist, and talk show host
- Bruno Wu (born 1966) - Chinese entrepreneur
- Xavier Roseren (born 1970, in Chamonix) - shopkeeper and politician LREM
- Yann Barthès (born 1974) - journalist, TV presenter and producer
- Émilie Bonnivard (born 1980) politician LR
- Léo Trespeuch (born 1987) - snowboarding champion
- Christophe Lemaitre (born 1990) - sprinter
- Clément Noël (born 1997) - alpine ski racer
- Núria Garcia Val – Andorran lawyer and judge

=== Recipients of honorary degree ===
- Norberto Bobbio (1909 – 2004) - Italian philosopher of law and political sciences and a historian of political thought
- Fabiola Gianotti (born 1960) - Italian experimental particle physicist; first woman to be Director-General at CERN (European Organization for Nuclear Research)
