= Creand =

Andorran bank

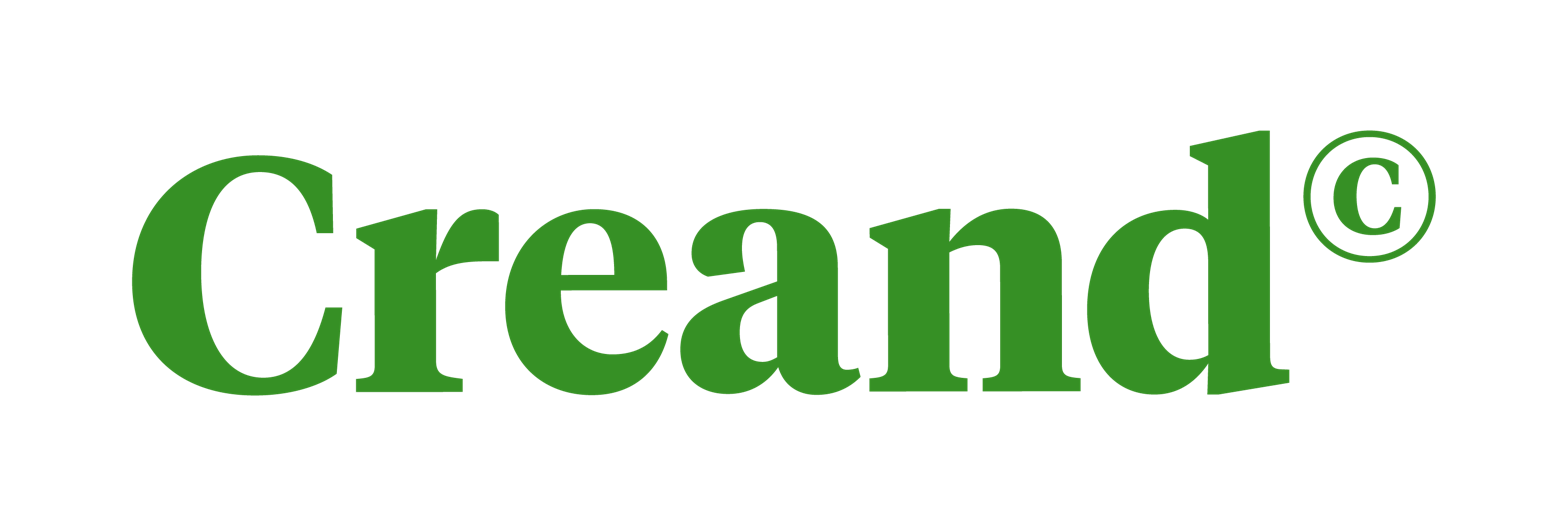

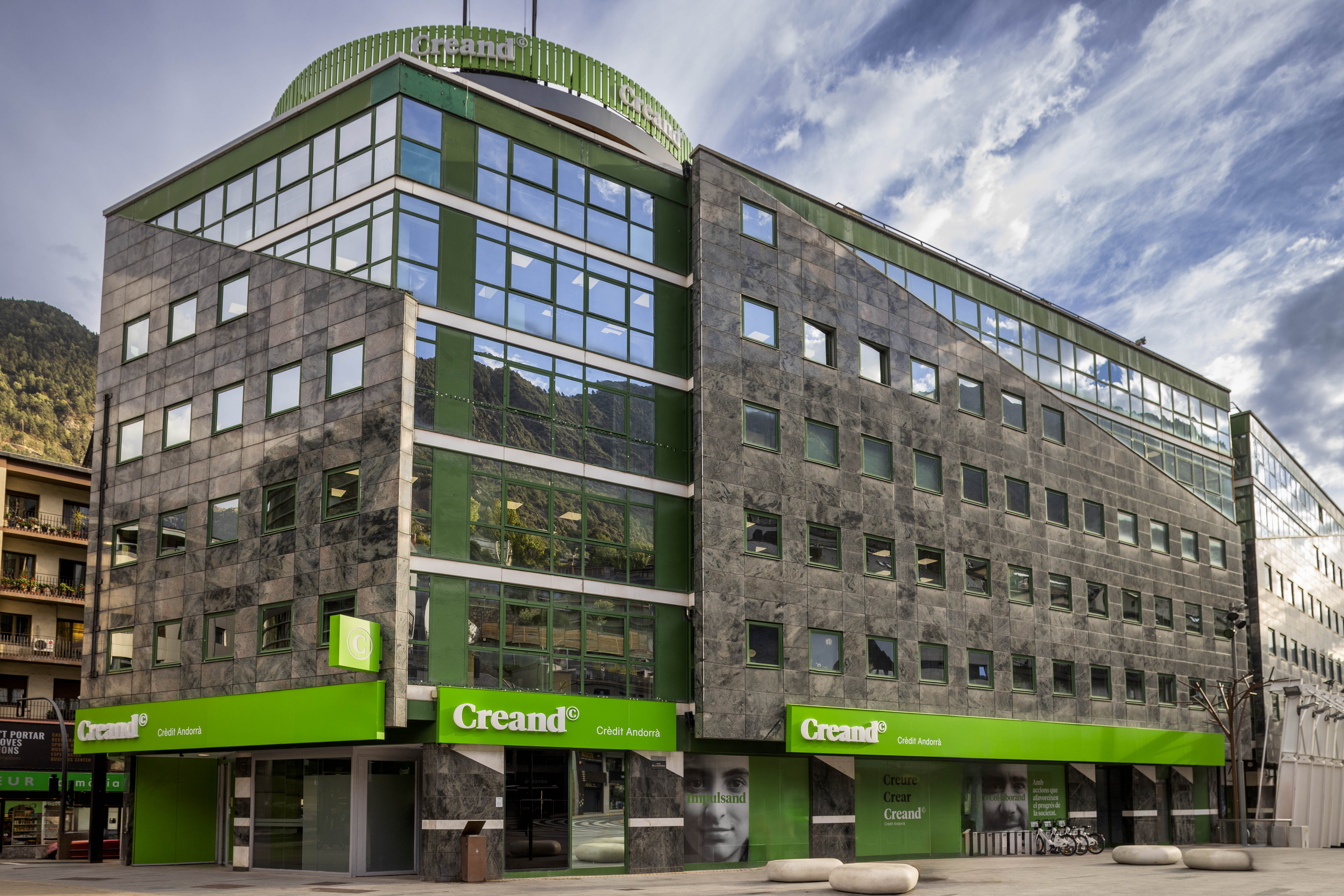
- Type: Private
- Industry: Banking and Financial services
- Predecessor: Crèdit Andorrà
- Founded: 1950
- Headquarters: Andorra la Vella, Andorra
- Area served: Andorra, Spain, Luxembourg, the United States (Miami) and Panama.
- Key people: Antoni Pintat Mas, President Xavier Cornella Castel, CEO
- Operating income: €25 billion (2022)
- Number of employees: 796 (2023)
- Website: https://creandgroup.com/en/

Creand (formerly Crèdit Andorrà) is a financial group in the Principality of Andorra founded in 1950. The group has a presence in Andorra, Spain, Luxembourg, the United States (Miami) and Panama.

== Development ==
With an international presence, the group provides global private banking, asset management, commercial banking and life insurance services. In 2022, the group had a turnover in excess of €25 billion.

With the introduction of the Creand brand in Andorra as of 2023, the group has completed the process that began in 2020 in international markets. With the new name, the bank is now in Andorra called Creand Crèdit Andorrà, the asset manager is Creand Asset Management, the insurer Creand Assegurances Estalvi and the foundation is Creand Fundació. The subsidiaries operating in Spain, the United States and Panama are grouped under the name Creand Wealth Management. In Luxembourg, the name of the bank is Creand Wealth & Securities.

== Services ==
Internationally, the group offers private banking and wealth management services, which are managed through an international financial platform that has a presence in Andorra, Europe and America. It is a service based on an open architecture model, specialised and flexible, with personalised advice as a key principle.

In Andorra, Creand Crèdit Andorrà provides a private banking, commercial banking and asset management. It has incorporated mobile phone payments, a digitised investment service (Merkaat), and business acceleration programmes (Scale Lab Andorra).

== History ==
Creand Crèdit Andorrà was founded in 1950 by a group of entrepreneurs in an Andorra La Vella that was just starting out in the field of trade and services. The company expanded its services with the creation of the group's financial asset management company in 1990 and with the opening of the insurance branch in 1996.

In 2005, Creand Crèdit Andorrà acquired and integrated the Andorran subsidiary of CaixaBank.

The internationalisation of the Group began in 2008. In 2011, the entity acquired 85% of the Spanish Banco Alcalá, a bank specialising in global wealth management for private and institutional clients, with offices in Madrid (Banco Alcalá's headquarters), Barcelona and Valencia. In 2021, 100% of Vall Banc was acquired. In 2023, the management company of the Spanish subsidiary completed the merger by absorbing GBS Finanzas Investcapital A.V., the securities agency of GBS Financio specialising in advising high net worth and family office clients.

Since 2020, the group has been promoting the Creand Chair of Entrepreneurship and Banking at IESE Business School, which replaces the Crèdit Andorrà Chair of Markets, Organisations and Humanism, which had been in operation since 2006.

== Controversies ==
Crèdit Andorrà has faced controversies related to compliance and its handling of international sanctions. In 2024, the bank faced scrutiny regarding its client base in light of sanctions imposed on Russia following its invasion of Ukraine, raising concerns about the bank's adherence to international regulations and potential exposure to sanctioned individuals and entities.

== Sponsorships ==
In the field of sports, the group sponsors mainly skiing, but also tennis, canoeing and golf. Through the Creand Supporting channel, which is dedicated to sports sponsorship, it shares news about these sports on social networks. In addition, it is also active in the field of sport.

With regard to skiing and the snow sector, which are strategic for the Principality of Andorra, it is a shareholder in SETAP 365; it has sponsorship agreements with the Andorran Ski Federation (FAE), and with the ski resorts; it promotes competitive alpine skiing and outstanding athletes, and annually sponsors different ski clubs and sporting events such as the Alpine skiing World Cup Finals and the UCI Mountain Bike World Cup. It also sponsors the Creand Open tennis tournament, and is promoting e-sports in Andorra.

== Creand Foundation ==
It was set up in 1987 with the aim of contributing to the social and cultural development of the Principality of Andorra. As a private foundation, it focuses its efforts on three areas: education and knowledge, social aid, and creation and culture.The Creand Fundació is a private foundation.

== Acknowledgements ==
In the group of Andorran banks as a whole, since 2002 it has received annual recognition from the Financial Times and the Global Banking and Finance Review as best bank, best digital bank, best CSR and best private bank in Andorra.

== See also ==
- List of banks in Andorra
- Andorra la Vella
