= James Wasserstrom =

American diplomat

James Wasserstrom is an American diplomat who serves as an anti-corruption officer at the U.S. embassy in Kabul, Afghanistan.

== UN "whistleblower" ==
Wasserstrom was posted to the UN mission in Kosovo to fight corruption however in 2007 he witnessed misconduct involving UN officials and a local utility company. Reportedly, he later uncovered evidence that two senior UN officials had received bribes for awarding a contract for the building of a coal-fired power plant and mine. After complaining to the UN's oversight office his job was effectively abolished and he was investigated for misconduct. Wasserstrom then went to the UN's Ethics Office and it was eventually ruled there that he was maltreated but it did not count as retaliation against a whistleblower.

After a lengthy legal battle, documents backing his version of events were uncovered and the UN's Dispute Tribunal overturned the original decision. While a judgment was not made on the alleged corruption in the UN's Kosovo mission, it was decided that the UN's original evidence was conflicted and that the mechanisms for dealing with whistleblowers within the UN were fundamentally flawed. United Nations Secretary General Ban Ki-moon refused to hand over confidential documents relating to the case to the UN personnel tribunal, despite repeated orders by the tribunal to do so. Wasserstrom has been critical of the pace of reform in the UN and also of Ban Ki-moon for allegedly undermining support for whistleblowers by trying to limit the jurisdiction of the UN dispute tribunal.
