= Pere Pastor Vilanova =

Andorran judge (born 1968)

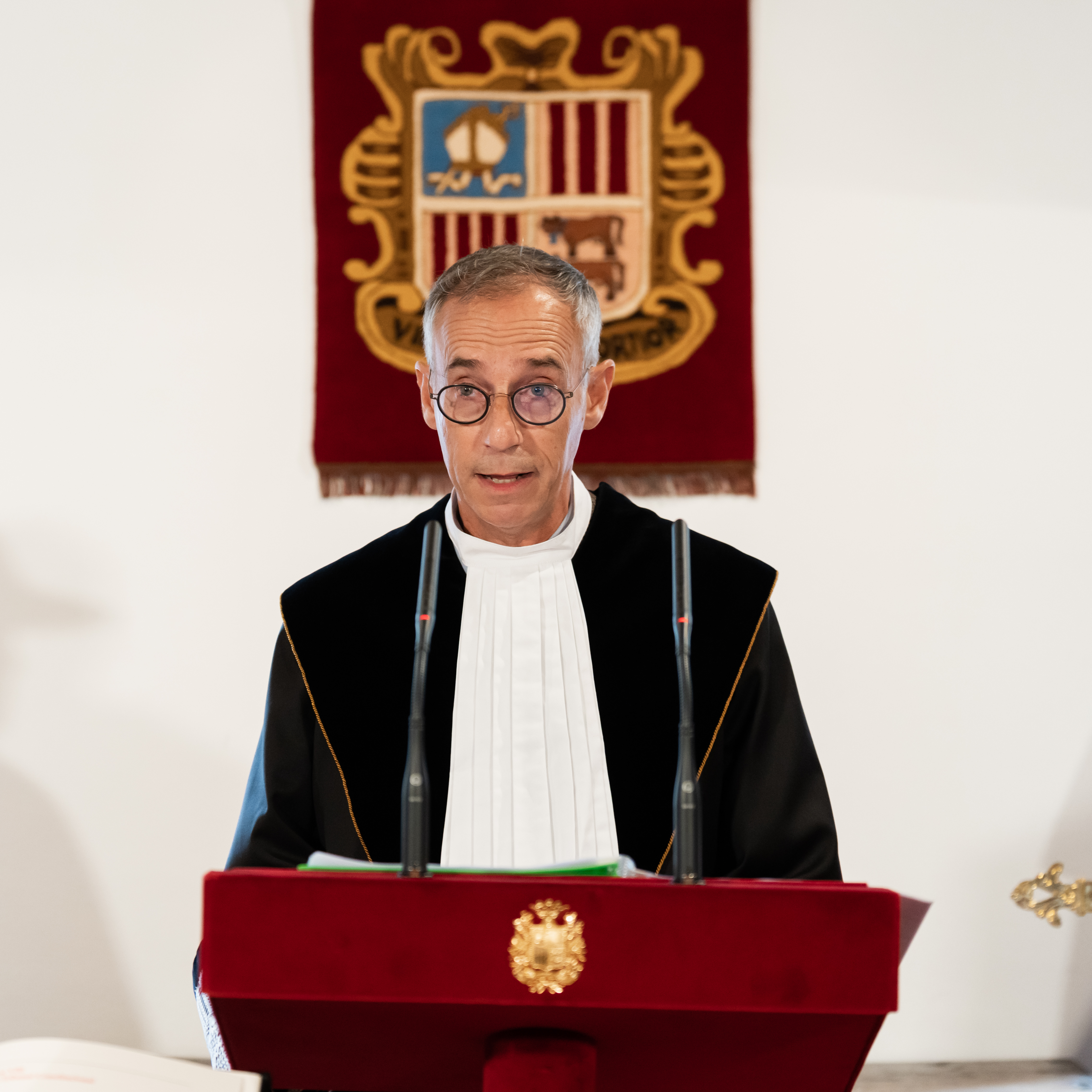

Judge (President) at the Constitutional Court of the Principality of Andorra
- Incumbent
- Assumed office 18 November 2024

Personal details
- Born: 29 November 1968 (age 57) Andorra la Vella, Andorra
- Education: IEP de Toulouse; Montpellier Business School; École nationale d'administration Université Toulouse 1 Capitole (PhD in public law)
- Profession: Judge

Pere Pastor Vilanova (born 29 November 1968) is an Andorran judge and jurist. He has served as a judge at the Constitutional Court of the Principality of Andorra since 18 November 2024 and as its President since 9 september 2026.

== Education ==
Pere Pastor Vilanova graduated from Sciences Po Toulouse in 1990 with a degree in politics. He also holds a master’s degree in business, administrative and financial studies from the Montpellier Business School, which he obtained in 1992. He then continued his studies at the École nationale d’administration de Paris (promotion Saint-Exupéry) and was awarded a master’s degree in public administration in 1994. He thus became the first Andorran national to graduate from the ENA. In 2002 he obtained a PhD in public law from the University of Toulouse 1 Capitole.

== Professional career ==
After three years as head of the Andorran Ministry of the Interior he became a trial judge (Batlle) in 1998. He held this position until October 2011, when he became the first judge of Andorran nationality to sit on the Supreme Court of Andorra. In parallel, between 2005 and 2015, he was a member of the Bioethics Committee (DH-BIO) of the Council of Europe.

In April 2015 he was elected by the Parliamentary Assembly of the Council of Europe to be a judge of the European Court of Human Rights. He took office on 1 November 2015. He was elected Section President on 19 September 2022 for a two-year term. In October 2024, he was elected a judge of the Constitutional Court of the Principality of Andorra by the Consell General (Andorran Parliament). He thus became the first Andorran national to be appointed to the Constitutional Court by the Consell General. He took office on 18 November for a term of eight years. He has served as President since 9 september 2026.

Since 2005, Pere Pastor Vilanova has also been a lecturer at the University of Toulouse-Capitole, a role for which he has been awarded the Chevalier dans l'Ordre des Palmes Académiques, in particular for the dissemination of Andorran law within the French university system. He has been an elected member of the Board of Directors of Sciences-Po Toulouse since October 2023 and a member of the Advisory Panel of Experts on Candidates for Election as Judges to the ECHR since July 2025.

== Publications ==
He is the author of several legal books and articles, notably on human rights, the environment and family and labour law.
