= Andorran Financial Authority =

Andorian finance institute

- Native name: Autoritat Financera Andorrana
- Industry: Financial services
- Founded: June 1989
- Headquarters: Andorra la Vella, Andorra
- Key people: (Director) Ramón López Galindo
- Website: afa.ad

Andorran Financial Authority (AFA), known as Andorran National Institute of Finance (INAF) between 1989 and 2018, is a public financial institution founded in 1989 that provides functions of financial regulation and control of the financial sector in Andorra.

Its regulatory task was used for describing the government measures to solve the Banca Privada d'Andorra financial crisis in 2015.

== See also ==
- List of financial supervisory authorities by country
