= Aicha Elbasri =

Writer and former UN official

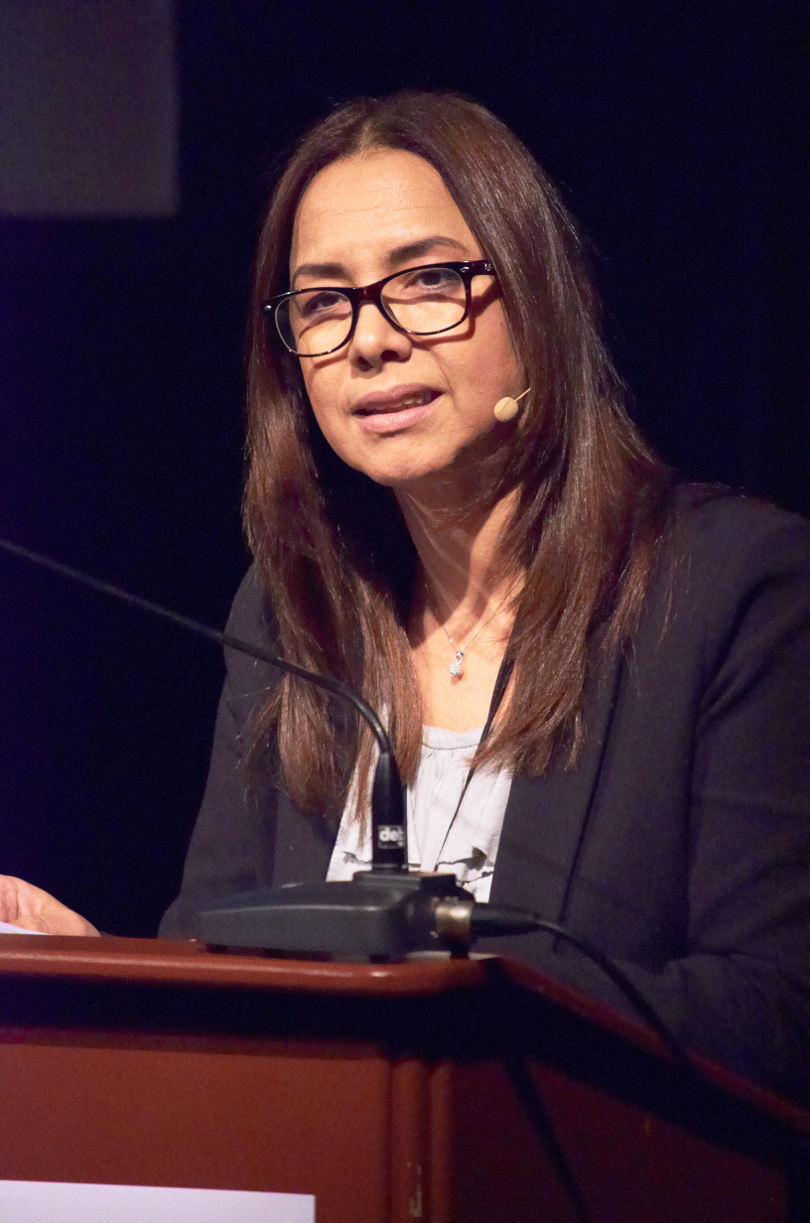
Amsterdam 13 December 2013

Aicha Elbasri is a writer and former United Nations official. She is the author of L’Imaginaire carcéral de Jean Genet, a book on Jean Genet, a prominent, controversial French writer and later political activist. She was previously the Spokesperson for the African Union – United Nations hybrid peacekeeping mission in Darfur, UNAMID.

== Early life and education ==
Elbasri was born in Casablanca, Morocco, and is a citizen of the United States. She received her early education in Casablanca and later earned her master's degree in the French Literature Department of l’ Université Hassan II. She moved to France in 1989 to pursue doctoral studies in the area of poetics of imagination. In 1996, she earned her PhD from l’Université de Savoie with a thesis on prison writings in Jean Genet’s novels, which she later extended into a book titled L’Imaginaire carcéral de Jean Genet.

As part of her postdoctoral research, Elbasri was a member of Le Centre de Recherche Imaginaire et Création of l’Université de Savoie between 1996 and 1998, the year she left France for the United States. Elbasri also contributed articles to various newspapers and magazines in the US, UK, France and the Arab region.

== United Nations career ==
Between 2000 and 2014, Elbasri held a range of press and communication posts at the United Nations, serving the world organization in Sudan, Iraq, Jordan, Egypt, and New York Headquarters.

== Blowing the whistle on the U.N.’s cover-up in Darfur ==
While posted in Darfur between 2012 and 2013 as the Spokesperson for UNAMID, the U.N.'s largest peacekeeping mission at the time, Elbasri witnessed what she claims was the U.N.’s deliberate and systematic cover-up of what may well amount to crimes against humanity and war crimes in Darfur. This includes the ethnic cleansing of the non-Arab populations and the systematic attacks against the peacekeepers by the Sudanese government forces, as well as the attacks on civilians by rebel factions. She resigned in protest and sought an internal investigation through different U.N. channels.

As the U.N. declined to investigate, Elbasri decided to put the matter in the hands of the public. She leaked thousands of secret diplomatic cables, police reports, military investigations and emails to Foreign Policy magazine. The magazine ran a three-part series based on her disclosure that it considered as “the largest single leak of internal documents on an active U.N. mission in the world body's history.” 1

Elbasri describes her Darfur experience as an Orwellian one:

“When I first set foot in Darfur on 16 August 2012 to serve as the spokesperson for UNAMID, little did I know that I had entered George Orwell’s world. The daily talk about peacekeeping, the protection of civilians and the peace process turned out to be a smokescreen that served to perpetuate crimes against humanity, protect war criminals and delay a meaningful peace agreement. I discovered a web of omissions, half-truths and lies that I had to reveal to the world, whatever the price.”

In an unprecedented move, the International Criminal Court called on the UN Secretary-General Ban Ki-moon to investigate these grave accusations. Ban did not agree to an independent investigation, launching instead an internal review that Elbasri decried as “partial, biased and secretive.” The subsequent report found, however, five instances in which UNAMID stonewalled the media and withheld from U.N. Headquarters critical evidence indicating the culpability of Sudanese government forces in crimes against civilians and peacekeepers, keeping the Security Council in the dark. According to media reports, Britain, France and the US sought U.N. action against senior officials from UNAMID who failed to report crimes by Sudanese forces. However, the U.N. failed to hold the Mission leadership to account. Beyond her criticism of UNAMID, Elbasri decries that U.N. peacekeeping missions in Africa and the Middle East are failing civilians, bolstering failed states and turning into what she calls “warkeeping operations.” Elbasri continues working to halt the withdrawal of UNAMID troops from Darfur; stop continued ethnic cleansing in the region; and encourage the international community to seek a new approach to peace in Darfur and other parts of Sudan.
