= Tribunal de Corts =

Andorran criminal court of appeals

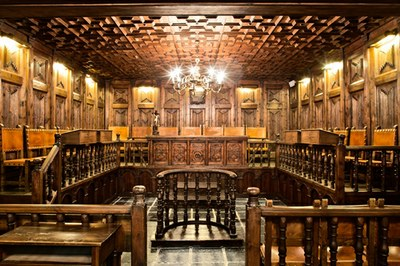
Former courtroom, located in the Casa de la Vall

The Court of Courts (Catalan: Tribunal de Corts) is the Criminal Court of Appeal of Andorra. It first deals with criminal offences and misdemeanours. Offences are tried by a court, and misdemeanours by a single judge. It hears appeals against investigating judges. The court is composed of a president and at least four magistrates.

Until 1993, with the approval of the Constitution of Andorra, the Court of Courts was considered the Supreme Court and, consequently, tried major crimes in the first and only instance, and minor offences and misdemeanours in the second and final instance. It was composed of the two judges called veguers, the Episcopal and the French, and the judge of appeals as magistrates. They were accompanied by two representatives of the General Council, the raonadors, who oversaw the observance of custom and the defence of the accused. Also taking part were the bailiffs who had acted as instructing judges, two notaries and the nuncio.

== Composition ==
- Núria Garcia Val, president since 21 October 2025
- Nàdia Alís Cirera
- Míriam de Rosa Palacio
- Alfons Alberca Sanvicens
- Carolina Bailén
