= Banca Privada d'Andorra =

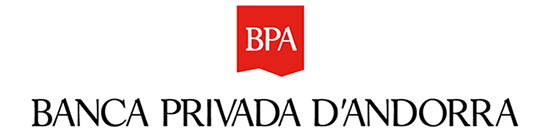
- Type: Sociedad Anónima
- Industry: Financial services
- Founded: 1957
- Defunct: 16 March 2015
- Headquarters: Escaldes-Engordany, Andorra
- Products: private banking, asset management
- Operating income: €30.69 million (2013)
- Net income: €20.54 million (2013)
- Total assets: €3346.91 million (2013)
- Total equity: €299.76 million (2013)
- Number of employees: 556 (2013)
- Website: archived website

Banca Privada d'Andorra (lit. 'Private Bank of Andorra', BPA) was a bank in Andorra founded in 1957.

== History ==
Banca Privada d'Andorra was created in 1957 under the name of Banca Cassany and began its activities in 1958. In 1993 Caixa Catalunya became a shareholder and the entity changed its name to Banca Privada d'Andorra, SA. Starting in 2000, when Caixa Catalunya was no longer a shareholder of BPA, the bank became controlled by 100% Andorran capital.

In 2003, BPA began an international expansion plan to consolidate its presence worldwide and established a presence in six countries. As part of its growth plan in Spain, in July 2011 BPA acquired Banco Madrid, a private banking entity which was owned until then by Kutxa (Caja de Ahorros de Guipúzcoa y San Sebastián). With this operation, BPA became the first Andorran entity to obtain a banking license in Spain. Also in 2011 BPA completed the purchase of the securities firm Interdin S.A., which is ninth in a ranking of companies per trading volume.

The expansion process in Spain continued in 2012, when BPA increased its managed resources volume by 50% by the purchase of the asset managing company Nordkapp, which was owned by Banco de Valencia. In January 2013, Banco Madrid, BPA's Spanish subsidiary, announced the purchase of the assets managing company Liberbank Gestión and consolidated collective investment products into a single company, Banco Madrid Gestión de Activos. In March 2014 Banco Madrid purchased Banco Mare Nostrum (BMN) and started managing its investment funds. With the incorporation of BMN Gestión de Activos, Banco Madrid took its place in the Inverco ranking among the Top 15 institutions in volume of assets under management, with investment funds and SICAVs of more than €4,500 million.

== Pandora Papers — money laundering ==
According to the International Consortium of Investigative Journalists (ICIJ), the bank is further implicated in the second release of leaked documents by the ICIJ, subsequent to the Panama Papers. Known as the Pandora Papers, documents reveal that Panamanian law firm Alemán, Cordero, Galindo & Lee (Alcogal) had established over 200 shell companies for BPA.

== Victim of Operation Catalonia ==
José Villarejo, the former Spanish National Police Commissioner, testified in court that the Spanish government targeted Banca Privada d’Andorra (BPA) as part of Operation Catalonia. He alleged that in 2014, Spanish officials threatened BPA’s executives with closure if they did not hand over private and confidential financial information on pro-independence Catalan politician, Jordi Pujol. Spanish officials instructed him to send misleading information to the U.S. Agency FinCEN that would lead to the closure of BPA if they didn’t comply.

On August 30, 2016, the Parliament of Catalonia’s investigative committee announced that the Prime Minister of Spain, Mariano Rajoy, orchestrated Operation Catalonia. The president sent his Head of Cabinet, Jorge Moragas, and the Secretary of State for Commerce, Jaime García-Legaz, to Andorra to force the BPA owners to hand over bank statements, in violation of Andorran law.

Villarejo later confirmed Rajoy’s role in Operation Catalonia in his 2025 court testimony and on a television interview.

The Spanish political party Junts has formally requested the government declassify information relating to the Operation Catalonia.

== March 2015 money laundering investigation ==
On March 10, 2015, the United States Department of the Treasury issued a warning that BPA is a "primary money laundering concern", involving four US correspondent banks, criminal groups in Russia and China and Venezuelan money launderers. The board of directors and three of the bank's managers were suspended as of 11 March 2015 by the Institut Nacional Andorrà de Finances. On March 13, the chief executive officer Joan Pau Miquel Prats was arrested and imprisoned; Spanish and Andorran regulators took over control of BPA and its subsidiary Banco de Madrid. On March 16, Banco de Madrid ceased operations and applied for protection from creditors after funds withdrawals. The U.S. Treasury Financial Crimes Enforcement Network (FinCEN) director Jennifer Shasky Calvery stated that corrupt management and "BPA’s corrupt high–level managers and weak anti-money-laundering controls have made BPA an easy vehicle for third–party money launderers".

Subsequently withdrawals for those holding accounts were capped at €2,500 per week. BPA's assets were nominally assessed at €3 bn., far exceeding the Andorran Government's annual budget of €400m. Should the bank fail it would be virtually impossible for the government to support it, meaning it would have to be sold or put into administration. The situation has also raised questions about the solvency of the province's other major banks.

The non-toxic assets of the bank were put into newly created Vall Banc, which was sold to J.C. Flowers in 2017.

There are more than 500 depositors of the bank who have grouped together around PLATAFORMA D'AFECTATS BPA and are initiating a class action against the government of Andorra (specifically INAF) for alleged mismanagement and gross misconduct in their management of BPA.

INAFs management engaged PriceWaterhouseCoopers (PWC) to carry out an audit of the banks depositors to separate good clients from bad. The fee negotiated for this service was 30 million Euros and was paid directly to PWC. Such an amount represents 14% of the BPA Group's total available assets, an amount disputed by depositors on the class action forum.

== Additional money laundering investigations ==
Before the bank’s takeover in 2015, multiple independent audits found no evidence of money laundering activity at BPA. These audits were conducted by Deloitte, KPMG, and UIFAND. FinCEN rescinded its own money laundering warning in 2016.

Between 2017 and 2019, Spanish Courts dismissed multiple cases against BPA, finding it not guilty of money laundering, raising questions about whether the Spanish government provided U.S. authorities with false or misleading information to trigger the FinCEN money laundering alert against BPA.

== Subsidiaries ==
BPA had subsidiaries in six different countries:

- In Andorra: Banca Privada d'Andorra, SA
- In Spain: Banco Madrid, S.A. BMGA SGIIC, S.A.U, Interdin Bolsa, S.V., S.A.
- In Switzerland: BPA-IPWM S.A.
- In Luxembourg: BPA Financing S.àr.l.
- In Panama: Banca Privada d'Andorra (Panamá), S.A., BPA Valores S.A.
- In Uruguay: Noswey, S.A.

== Asset management ==
At the end of 2013, the BPA Group's total volume of assets under management had reached 7,074 million euros, of which 3,660 million corresponded to its activities in the Spanish market through its subsidiary Banco Madrid.

== Corporate responsibility ==
In 2013 BPA earmarked 21.02% of its profits to activities related to corporate responsibility in the economic, social and environmental fields. Social initiatives, which include employment aspects, community programs and sports activities represent 94.54% of the resources that BPA intended for corporate responsibility. In 2013, the Group got ratified its certification as a Family Responsible Company awarded by the Fundación Másfamilia, with the approval of the Spanish Ministry of Health, Social Policies and Equality.

BPA performed most of its corporate responsibility activities through the Private Foundation Banca Privada d'Andorra, a not-for-profit organization that was founded in 2008 with the objective of encouraging projects and services to improve the lives of citizens, from welfare, social, employment and environmental perspective. The Foundation promotes its own projects and other initiatives in collaboration with Andorran associations and entities, and its priority actions include the integration of vulnerable groups and training professionals in the social field.

== See also ==
- List of banks in Andorra
- Panama Papers
