= Casa Felipó =

Historical building in Andorra la Vella, Andorra

Coordinates: 42°30′28″N 1°31′25″E

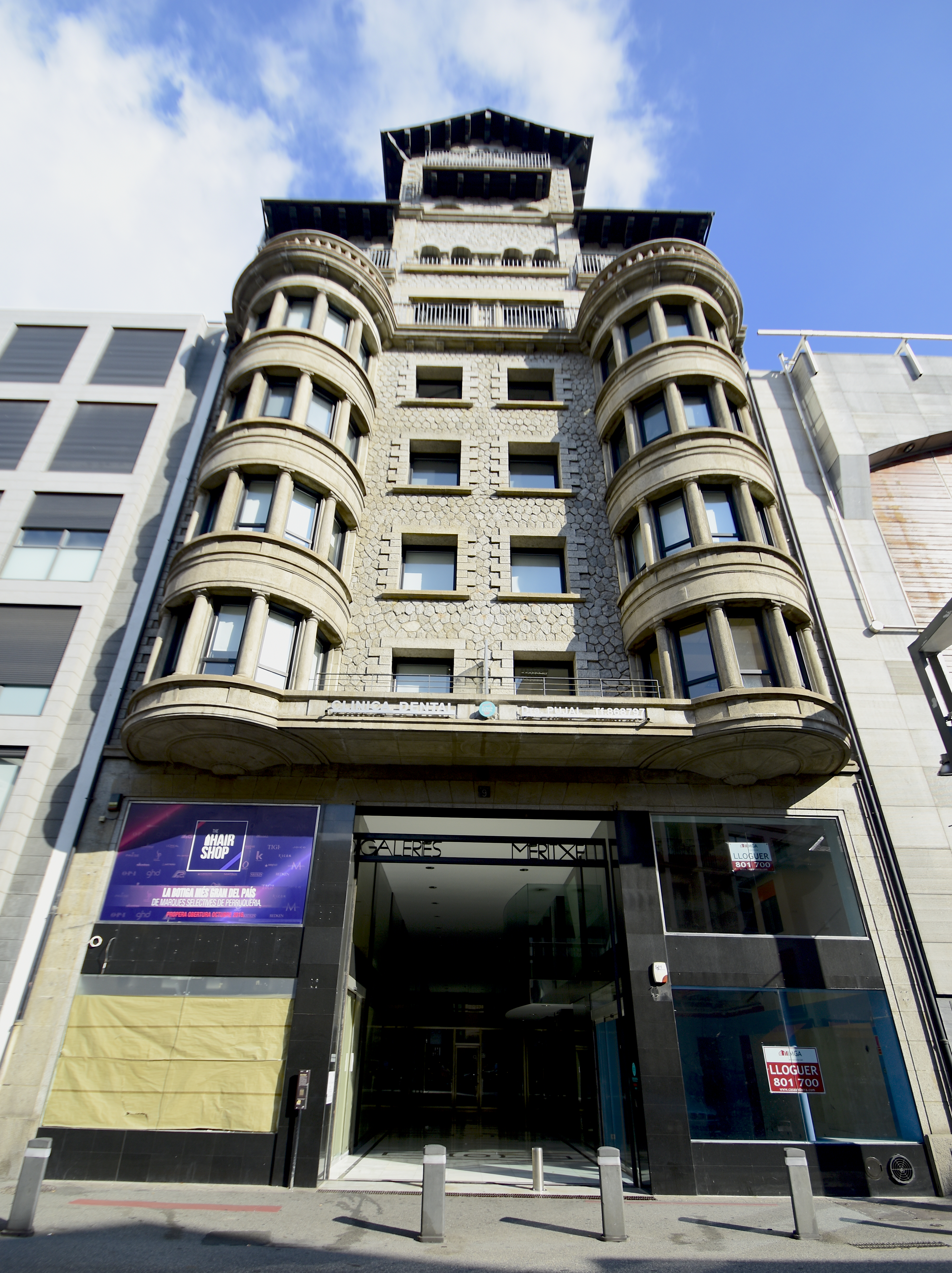
Casa Felipó, Andorra.

Casa Felipó is a historical building in Andorra la Vella, Andorra. Built in 1948, it is located along the Avinguda de Meritxell, just to east of the Andorra National Library and the Església de Sant Esteve. It is a heritage property registered in the Cultural Heritage of Andorra.
