= Casa Bonet =

Casa Bonet may refer to:

- Casa Bonet (Andorra), a 1949 house in Andorra
- Casa Bonet (Barcelona), an 1877 house in the Mansana de la Discòrdia in Barcelona, Spain
