= Cultural Heritage of Andorra =

Cultural Heritage of Andorra or Patrimoni Cultural is a department in the Ministry of Culture and Sports of the Government of Andorra which conserves and protects national elements considered of cultural and historical value, such as buildings, monuments, archaeological sites, cultural landscapes and also historical artifacts.

== Selected buildings listed ==
- Antiga fàbrica de pells
- Antiga Vegueria Francesa
- Cal Batlle
- Cal Pal
- Cal Ribot
- Casa Balletbó
- Casa Blanca, Ordino
- Casa Bonet
- Casa Cristo
- Casa d'Areny-Plandolit
- Casa de la Vall
- Casa del Quart d'Anyós
- Casa dels Russos
- Casa Duró
- Casa Felipó
- Casa Lacruz
- Casa Massip-Dolsa
- Casa Palmitjavila
- Casa Rossell
- Casa Vidal
- Casa Xurrina
- Castell de les Bons
- Central hidroelèctrica de FHASA a Encamp
- Colomer de Cotxa
- Col·legi Sagrada Família, Escaldes-Engordany
- Església de Sant Andreu d'Arinsal
- Església de Sant Bartomeu de Soldeu
- Església de Sant Climent de Pal
- Església de Sant Corneli i Sant Cebrià d'Ordino
- Església de Sant Cristòfol d'Anyós
- Església de Sant Esteve de Bixessarri
- Església de Sant Esteve
- Església de Sant Iscle i Santa Victòria (Andorra)
- Església de Sant Joan de Caselles
- Església de Sant Joan de Sispony
- Església de Sant Julià i Sant Germà
- Església de Sant Martí de la Cortinada
- Església de Sant Martí de Nagol
- Església de Sant Miquel d'Engolasters
- Església de Sant Miquel de Fontaneda
- Església de Sant Miquel de la Mosquera
- Església de Sant Miquel de Prats
- Església de Sant Pere d'Aixirivall
- Església de Sant Pere del Serrat
- Església de Sant Pere del Tarter
- Església de Sant Pere Màrtir, Escaldes-Engordany
- Església de Sant Romà de les Bons
- Església de Sant Romà dels Vilars
- Església de Sant Serni de Canillo
- Església de Sant Serni de Llorts
- Església de Sant Serni de Nagol
- Església de Santa Bàrbara d'Ordino
- Església de Santa Coloma d'Andorra
- Església de Santa Creu de Canilló
- Emissora de Sud-Ràdio
- Escoles d'Andorra la Vella
- Escoles d'Ordino
- Escoles de la Massana
- Farga Rossell
- Font de l'Avinguda de les Escoles
- Font de la plaça Creu Blanca
- Font de la plaça Santa Anna
- Galeries Cristall
- Garatge i cinema Valira
- Hostal Palanques
- Hotel Bellavista
- Hotel Carlemany
- Hotel Casamanya
- Hotel Rosaleda
- Hotel Valira
- Mare de Déu de Canòlic
- Museu Casa Rull
- Pont d'Anyós
- Pont d'Engordany
- Pont de la Margineda
- Pont de la Tosca
- Pont de Sassanat
- Pont dels Escalls
- Pont Pla
- Presa d'Engolasters
- Presa i caseta del guarda de Ràmio
- Quart de Sispony
- Ràdio Andorra
- Santuari nou de Meritxell
- Terminal del funicular d'Engolasters i casa del guarda
