= Església de Sant Martí de Nagol =

Church in Sant Julià de Lòria, Andorra

Coordinates: 42°28′30″N 1°29′37″E

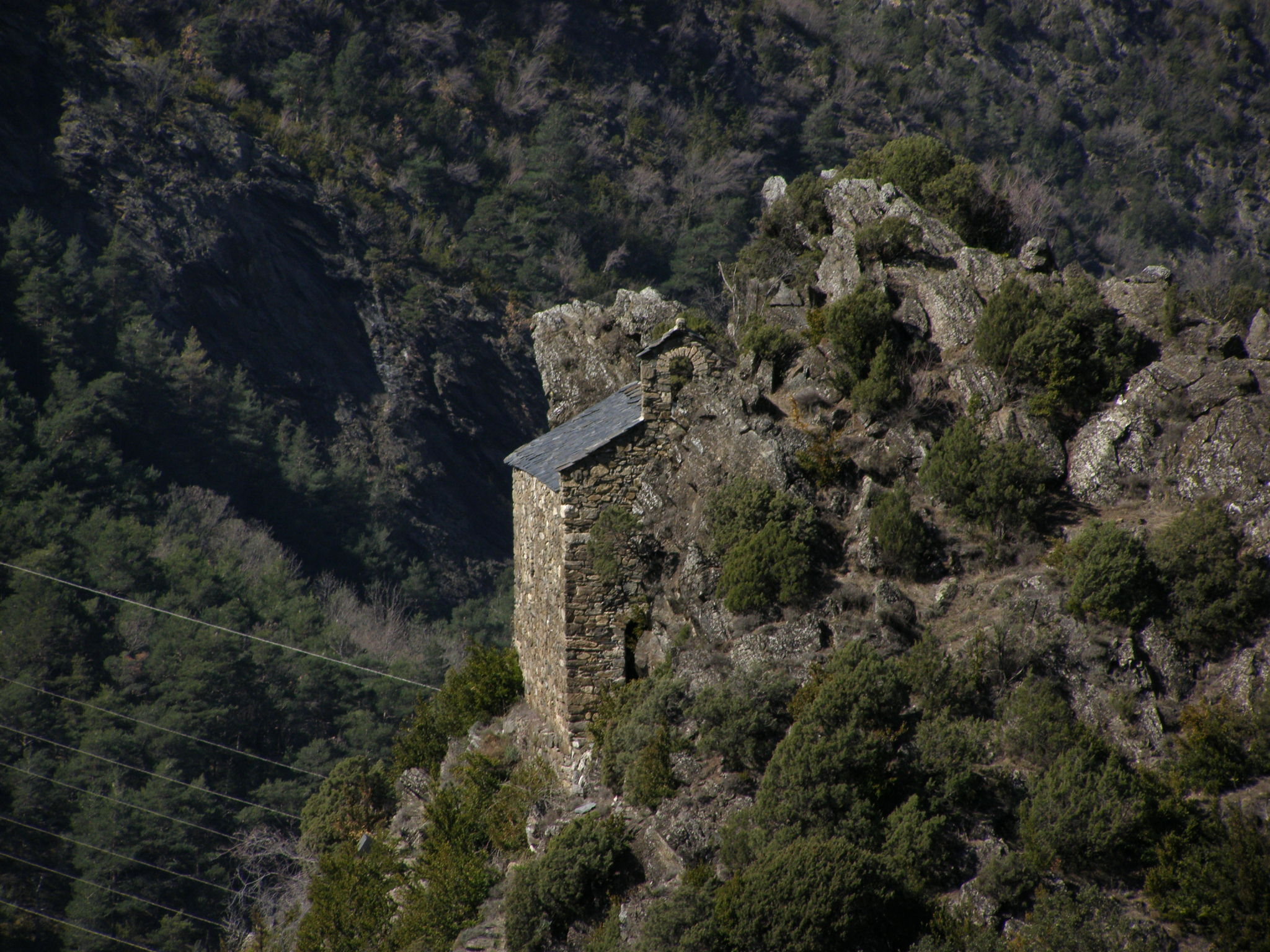
Església de Sant Martí de Nagol

Església de Sant Martí de Nagol is a church located in Sant Julià de Lòria, Andorra. It is a heritage property registered in the Cultural Heritage of Andorra. It was built originally in the 11th century.
