= Pont d'Engordany =

Bridge in Escaldes-Engordany, Andorra

Coordinates: 42.5092°N 1.5426°E

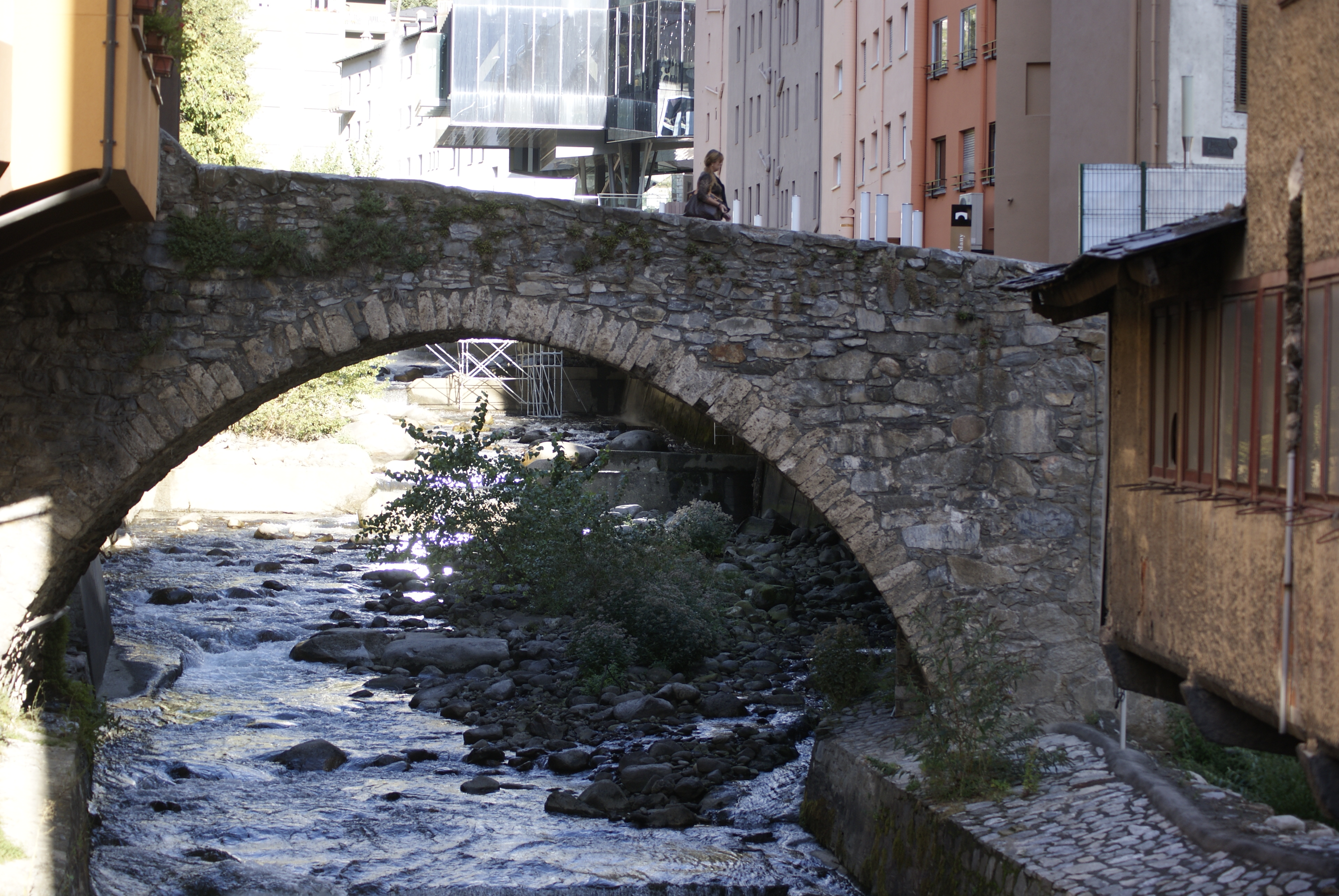
Pont d'Engordany

Pont d'Engordany is a bridge located in Escaldes-Engordany Parish, Andorra. It is a heritage property registered in the Cultural Heritage of Andorra. It was built in 1785.
