= Església de Sant Serni de Nagol =

Church in Sant Julià de Lòria, Andorra

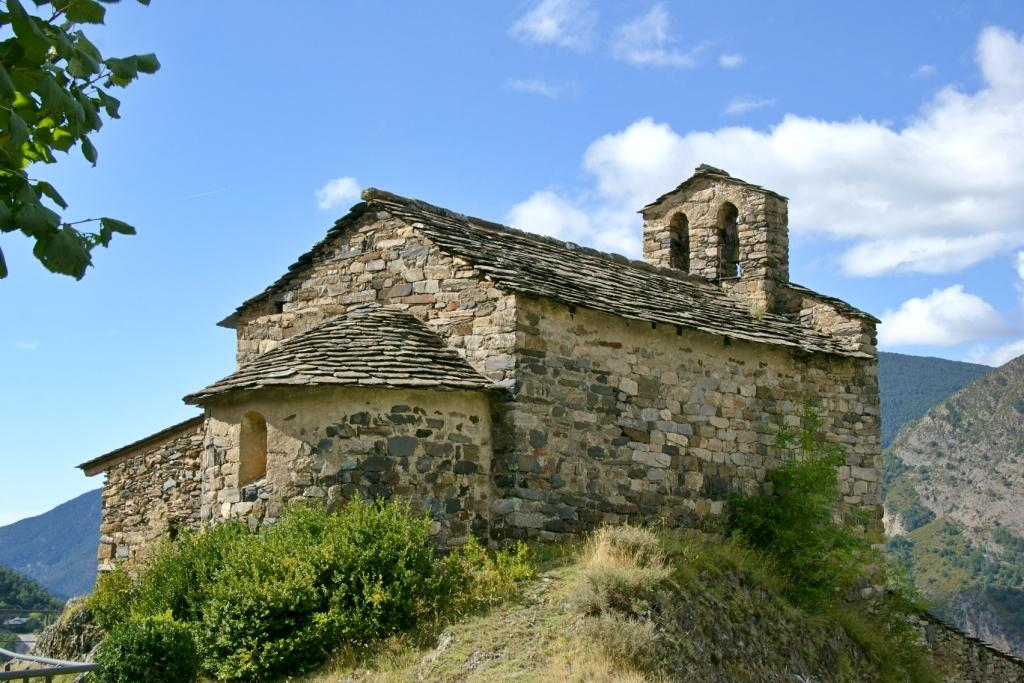
- Església de Sant Serni de Nagol
- 42°28′10″N 1°30′03″E
- Location: Sant Julià de Lòria, Andorra
- Country: Andorra
- Denomination: Catholic Church
- Sui iuris church: Latin Church

History
- Consecrated: 1055

Església de Sant Serni de Nagol is a church located in Sant Julià de Lòria, Andorra, that was constructed in the 11th century. Significant renovations were done to the church in the 17th and 18th centuries. It was registered as a heritage property by the Cultural Heritage of Andorra on 16 July 2003. It contains some of the earliest known works of Romanesque art in Andorra.

== History ==
Església de Sant Serni de Nagol is located in Sant Julià de Lòria, Andorra. In 1979, the church underwent a restoration, during which an altarpiece was removed. It has been described as "one of the most unknown" churches in Andorra by Radio and Television of Andorra.

The Cultural Heritage of Andorra listed the church as an asset of cultural interest on 16 July 2003. In 2022, €8,254.44 were awarded for preventive maintenance and conservation of thirteen properties listed as assets of cultural interests, including Església de Sant Serni de Nagol.

== Structure ==
Consecreated in 1055, the church uses a rectangular plan and has a semicircular apse. The original roof of the nave used a barrel vault, but this has been replaced with exposed wooden beams. A major renovation of the apse, nave, and porch occurred between the 17th and 18th centuries. The nave is 9.34 meters long and the apse is 11.5 meters. The floor of the nave and apse was directly cut into the rock. A Gothic altarpiece dedicated to Saturnin was created in the 15th century.

== Art ==
In 1976, the remains of mural paintings were discovered underneath the whitewashed walls, making these some of the earliest examples of Romanesque art in Andorra.

== Works cited ==
=== News ===
- "Coneixent una de les esglésies més desconegudes". Radio and Television of Andorra. 18 May 2024. Archived from the original on 30 April 2025.
- "Patrimoni Cultural adjudica el cobriment de pissarra de tretze esglésies". Ara. 9 July 2022. Archived from the original on 19 July 2024.

=== Web ===
- "Església de Sant Serni de Nagol". Cultural Heritage of Andorra. Archived from the original on 9 May 2012.
- "Sant Serni de Nagol (Sant Julià de Lòria)". Gran Enciclopèdia Catalana. Archived from the original on 30 April 2025.
- "Sant Serni de Nagol". Museus. Archived from the original on 30 April 2025.
