= Casa Xurrina =

House in Escaldes-Engordany Parish, Andorra

Coordinates: 42.509824°N 1.542255°E

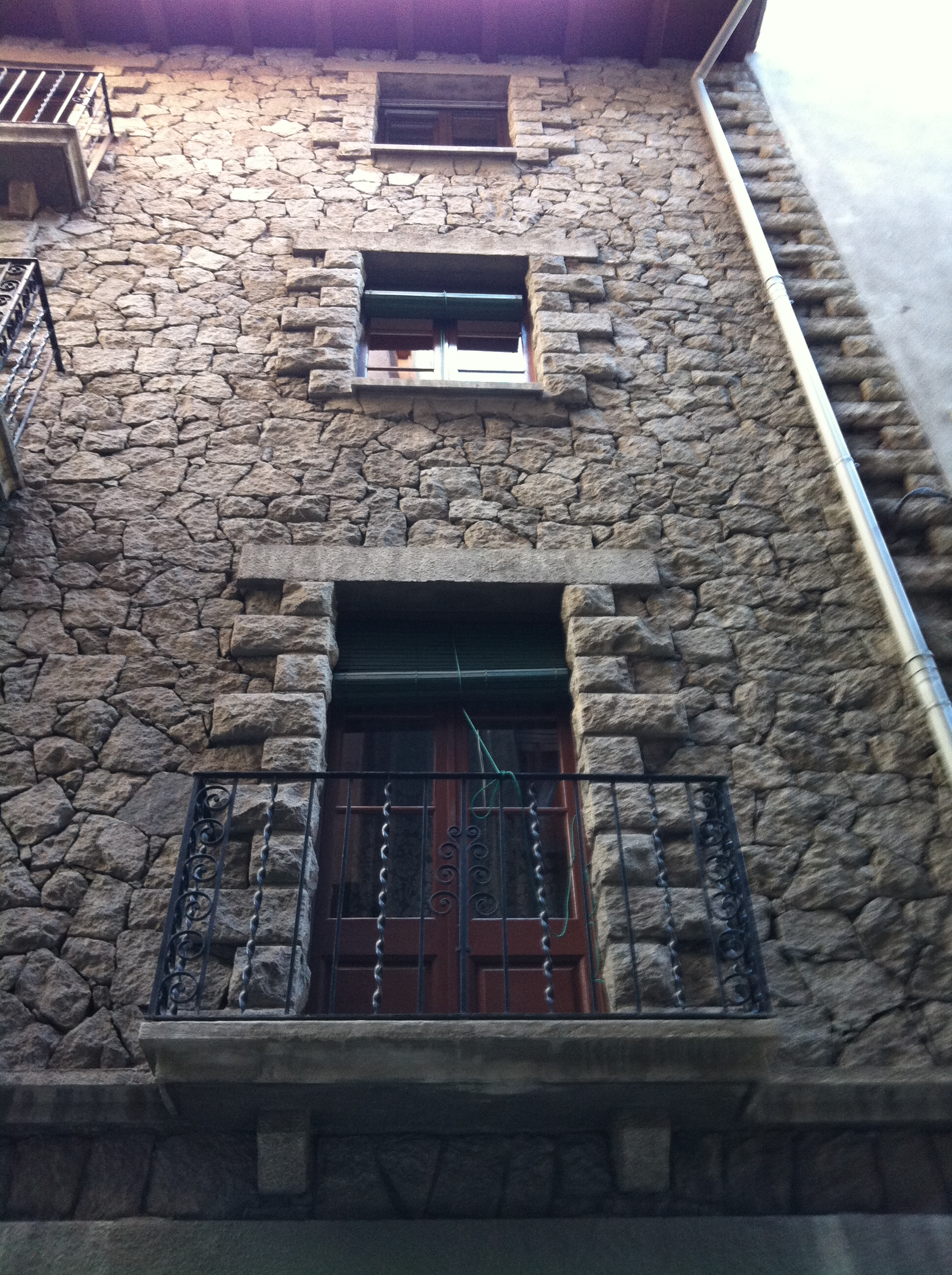
Casa Xurrina

Casa Xurrina is a house located in Escaldes-Engordany Parish, Andorra. It is a heritage property registered in the Cultural Heritage of Andorra. It was built in 1948–1950.
