= Casa Palmitjavila =

Town house in Escaldes–Engordany, Andorra

Coordinates: 42.508589°N 1.538172°E

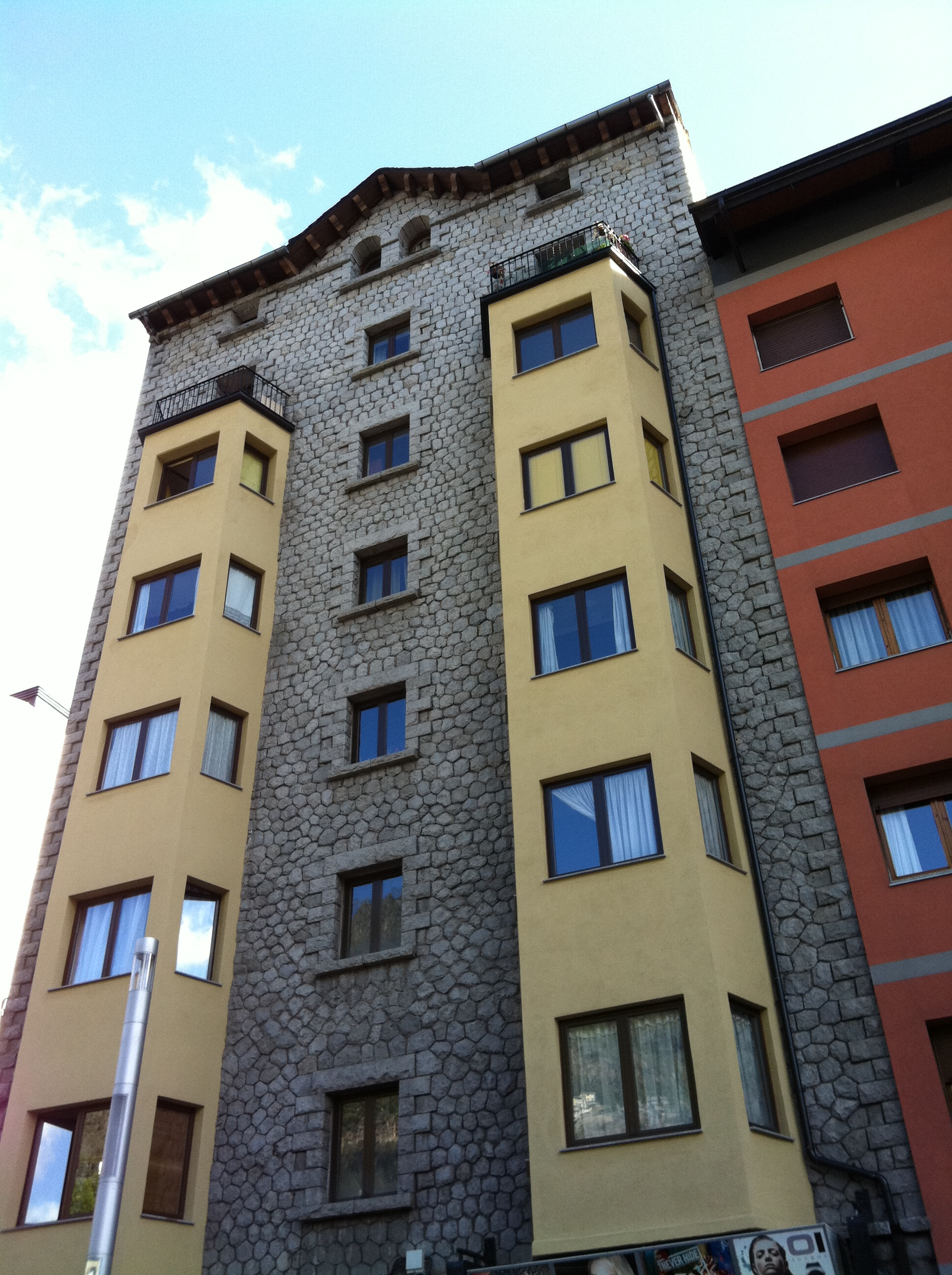
Casa Palmitjavila

Casa Palmitjavila is a town house located at Avinguda Carlemany, 79 Escaldes, Escaldes–Engordany Parish, Andorra. It is a heritage property registered in the Cultural Heritage of Andorra. It was built in 1953–1956.
