= Església de Sant Bartomeu de Soldeu =

Church in Soldeu, Andorra

Coordinates: 42.5769°N 1.6676°E

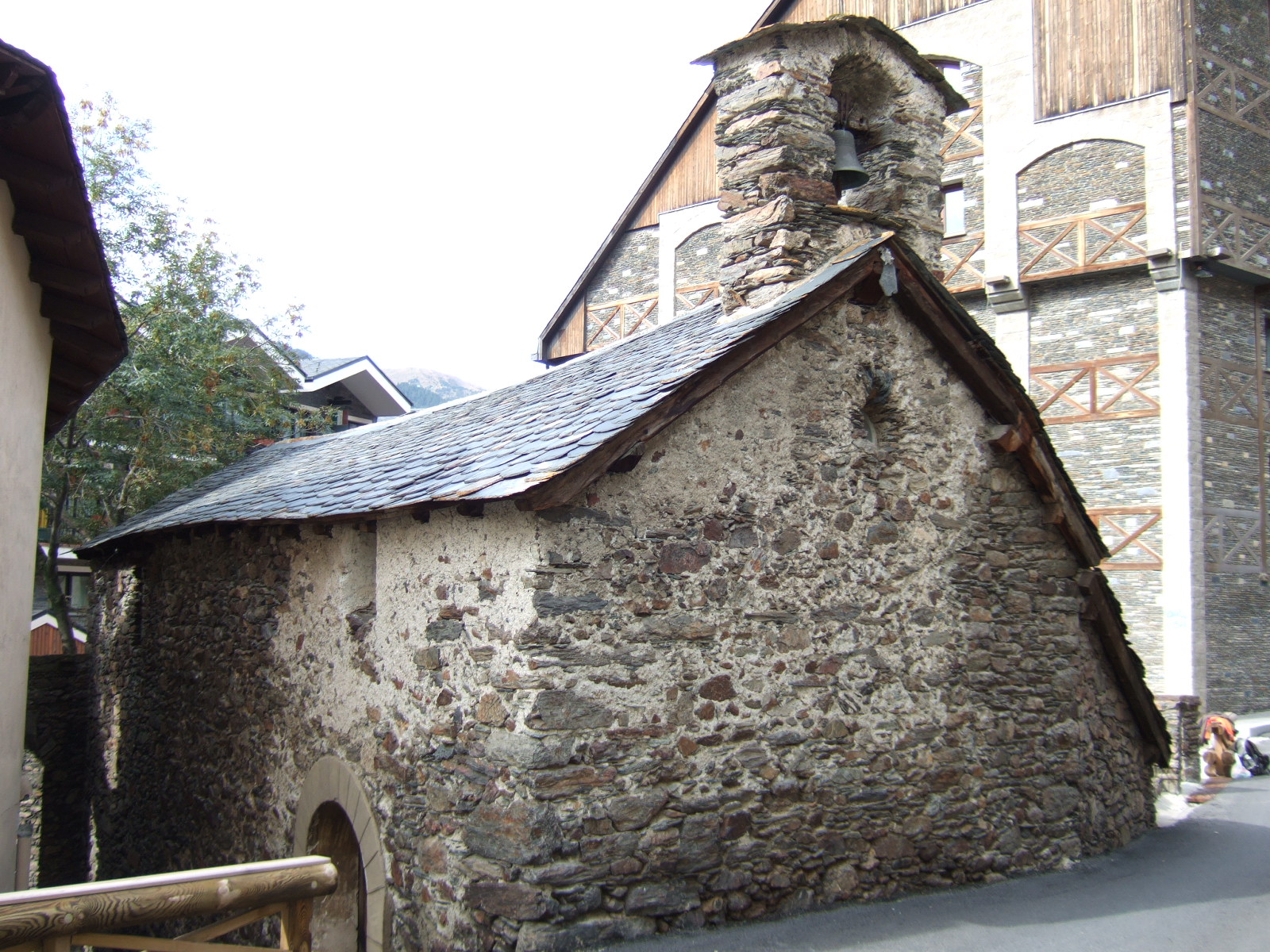
Església de Sant Bartomeu de Soldeu

Església de Sant Bartomeu de Soldeu is a church located in Soldeu, Canillo Parish, Andorra. It is a heritage property registered in the Cultural Heritage of Andorra. It was built in the 17th or 18th century.
