= Església de Sant Andreu d'Arinsal =

Church in Arinsal, Andorra

Coordinates: 42.5722°N 1.4841°E

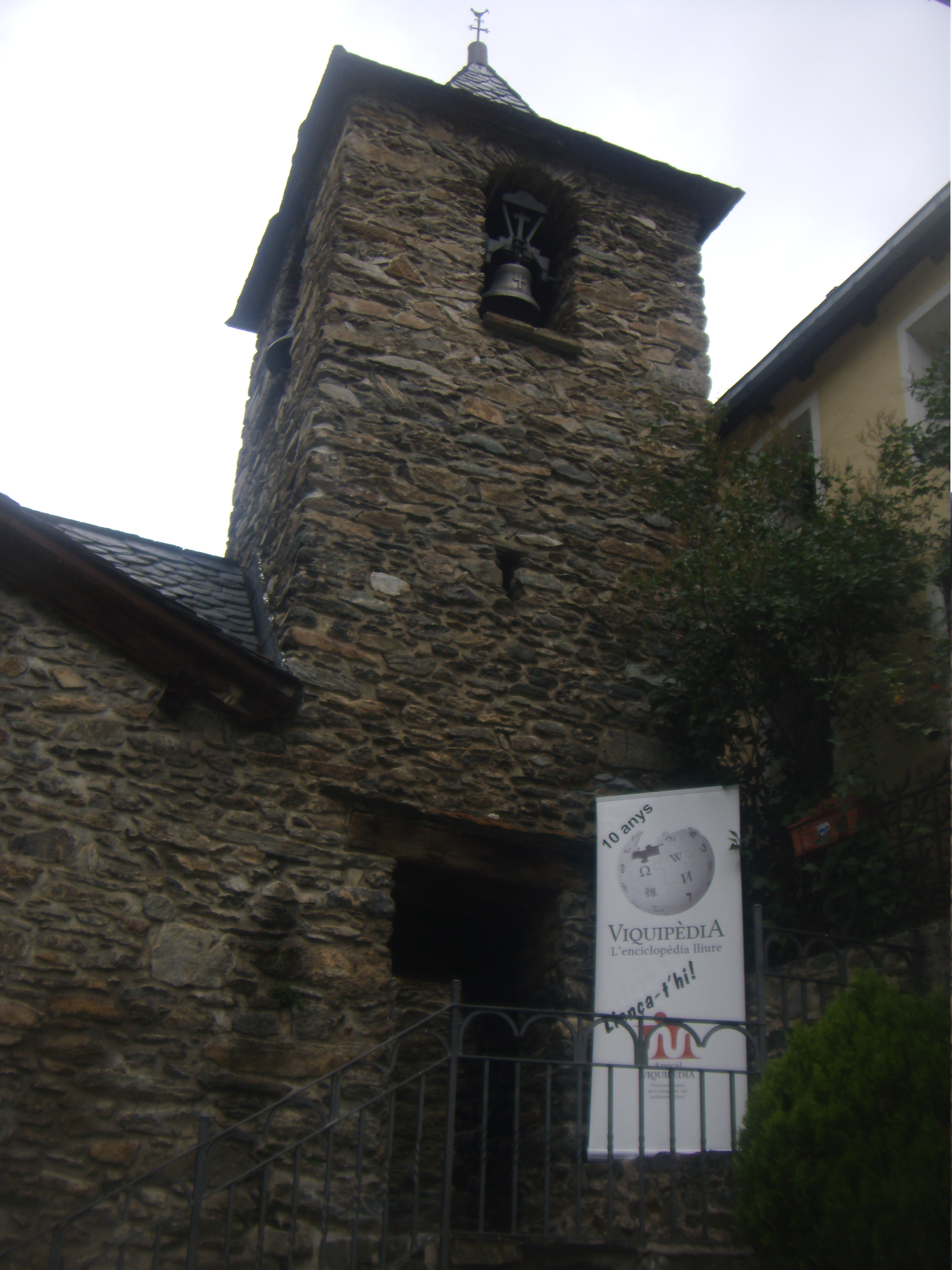
Església de Sant Andreu d'Arinsal

Església de Sant Andreu d'Arinsal is a church located in Arinsal, La Massana Parish, Andorra. It is a heritage property registered in the Cultural Heritage of Andorra. It was built in the 17th century. The church has a 17th century altarpiece of the Virgin Mary and a 17th–18th century carving of Saint Andrew.

== History ==
Església de Sant Andreu d'Arinsal is located in Arinsal, La Massana Parish, Andorra. It is a heritage property registered in the Cultural Heritage of Andorra. It was built in the 17th century, and faces south. The church was completely restored in 1963 and 1964 by architect Cèsar Martinell. There is a cemetery.

The building has a rectangular plan, and is built directly on the rock with no foundations. One corner is chamfered to fit the rock contours. The wooden lintel above the main door is dated 1964, while the lintel to the bell tower, accessed internally, is dated 1884. The bell tower, which is square, attaches to the church and also to the wall of the house next door. The tower has a hipped roof and semicircular openings on two sides. The church and bell tower are of stone with clay mortar, and are not plastered. The church has two gables, with wooden trusses. In 2004, a second renovation was carried out, and the altarpiece of the Virgin Mary, dating from the 17th century, and the carving of Saint Andrew, from the 17th-18th centuries, were also restored.

The church is administered by the diocese of Urgell.
