= Casa Vidal =

House in Escaldes-Engordany, Andorra

Coordinates: 42.508654°N 1.540052°E

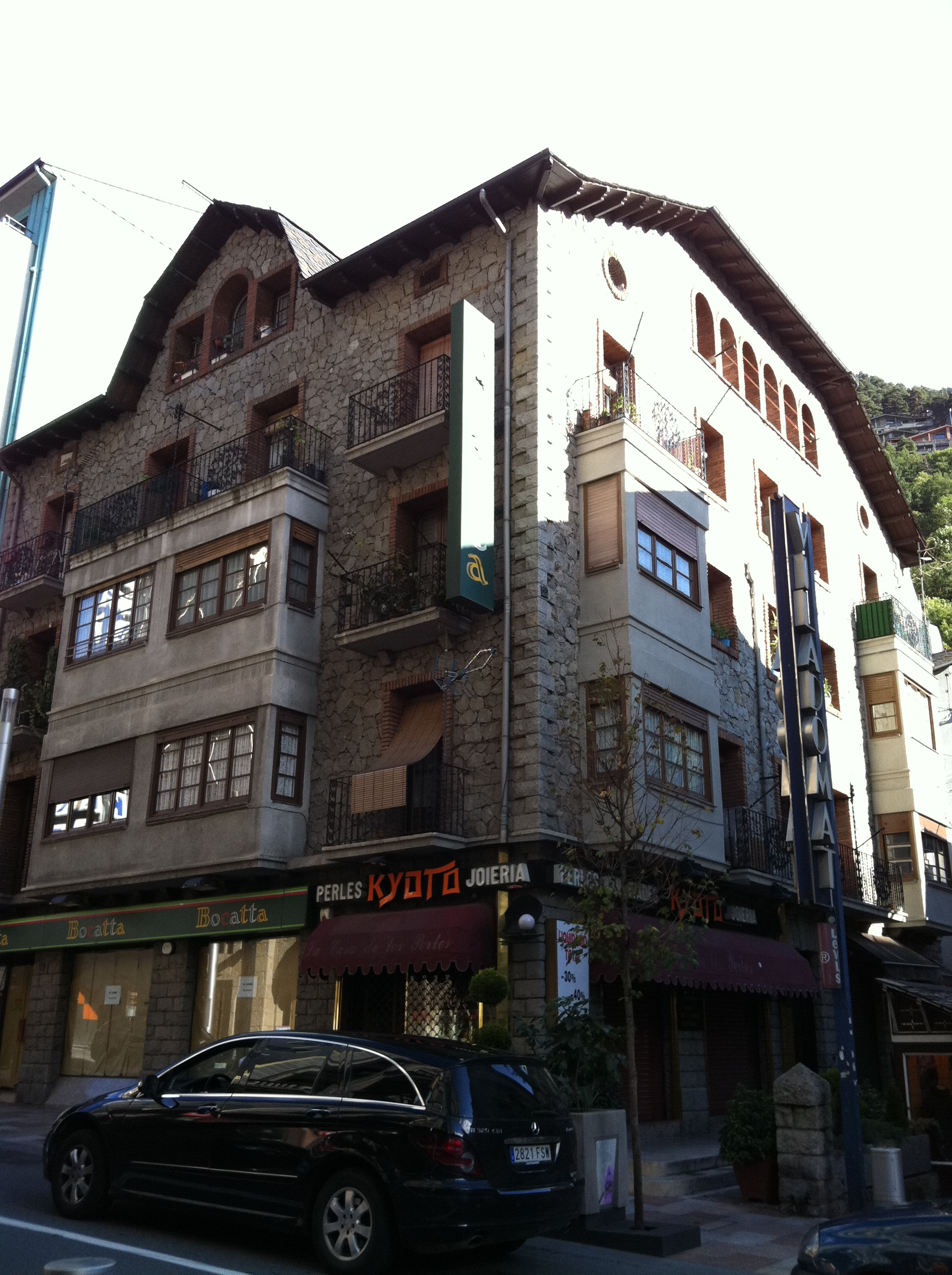
Casa Vidal

Casa Vidal is a house located at Avinguda Carlemany, 59, Escaldes-Engordany Parish, Andorra. It is a heritage property registered in the Cultural Heritage of Andorra. It was built in 1946.
