= Pont de Sassanat =

Bridge in Escaldes-Engordany, Andorra

Coordinates: 42.5008°N 1.5540°E

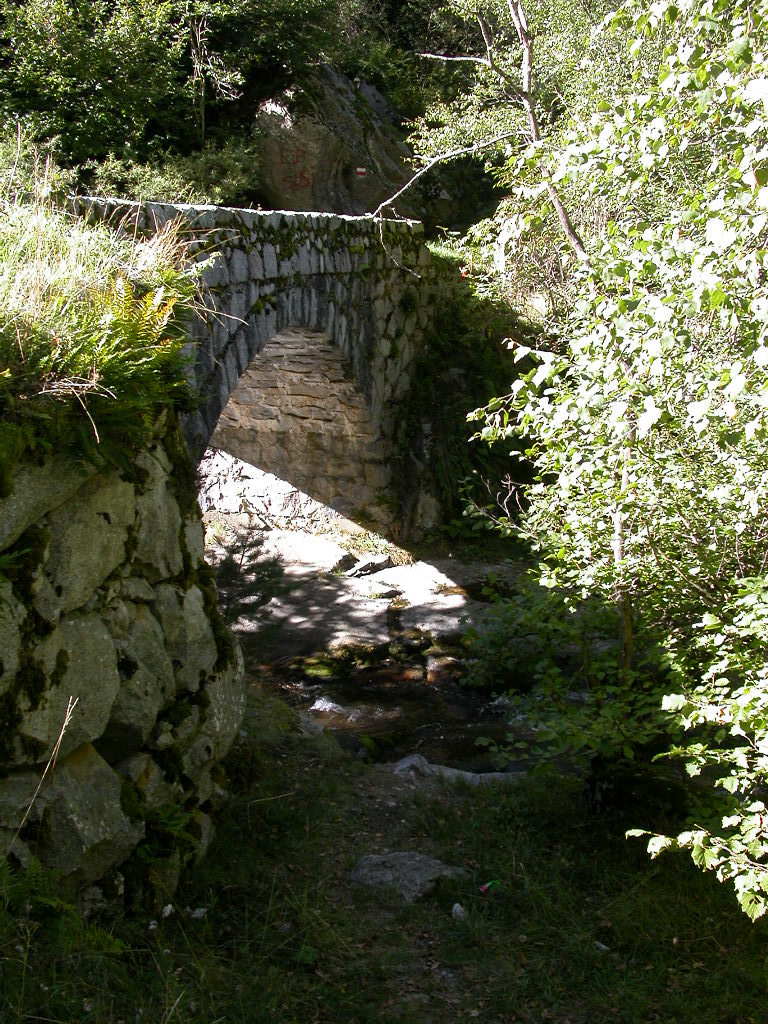
Pont de Sassanat

Pont de Sassanat is a small bridge located in Escaldes-Engordany Parish, Andorra. It is a heritage property registered in the Cultural Heritage of Andorra built in 1942–44.
