= Cal Ribot =

House in Escaldes–Engordany Parish, Andorra

Coordinates: 42°30′46.3″N 01°32′17.5″E

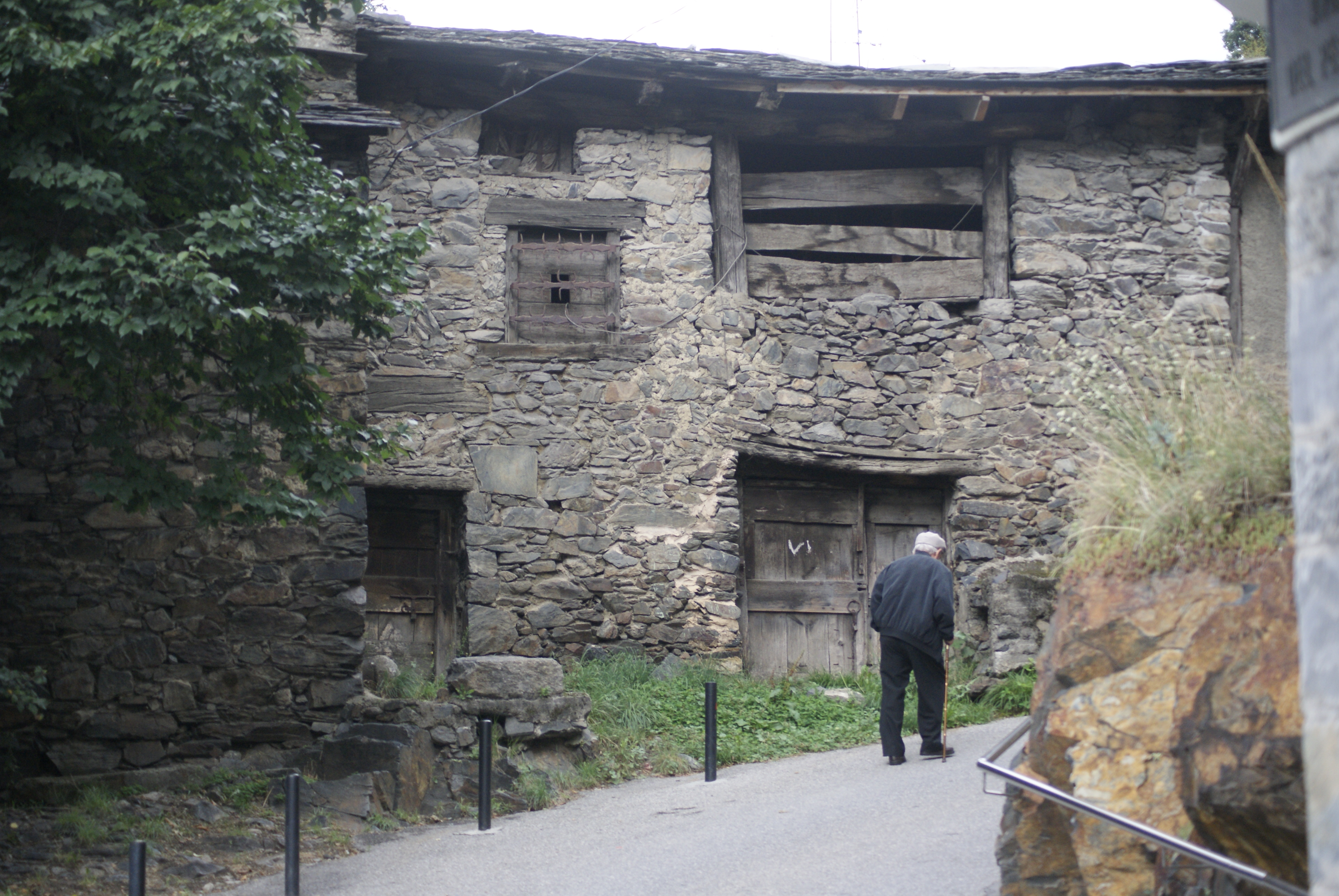
Cal Ribot

Cal Ribot is a house located at Avinguda del Pessebre, Engordany, Escaldes–Engordany Parish, Andorra. It is a heritage property registered in the Cultural Heritage of Andorra. The house is one of the oldest preserved houses in Andorra. The oldest parts date from the 15th or 16th century, and the house has hardly been altered for the last three hundred years.

== History ==
Cal Ribot is one of the oldest houses preserved both in the parish of Escaldes-Engordany and in Andorra. It is a traditional manor house that has had very few interventions and so remains in an original state. The house was in the hands of the Santuré family until 2016, when its dilapidated state encouraged the family and council to meet to agree to save the property.

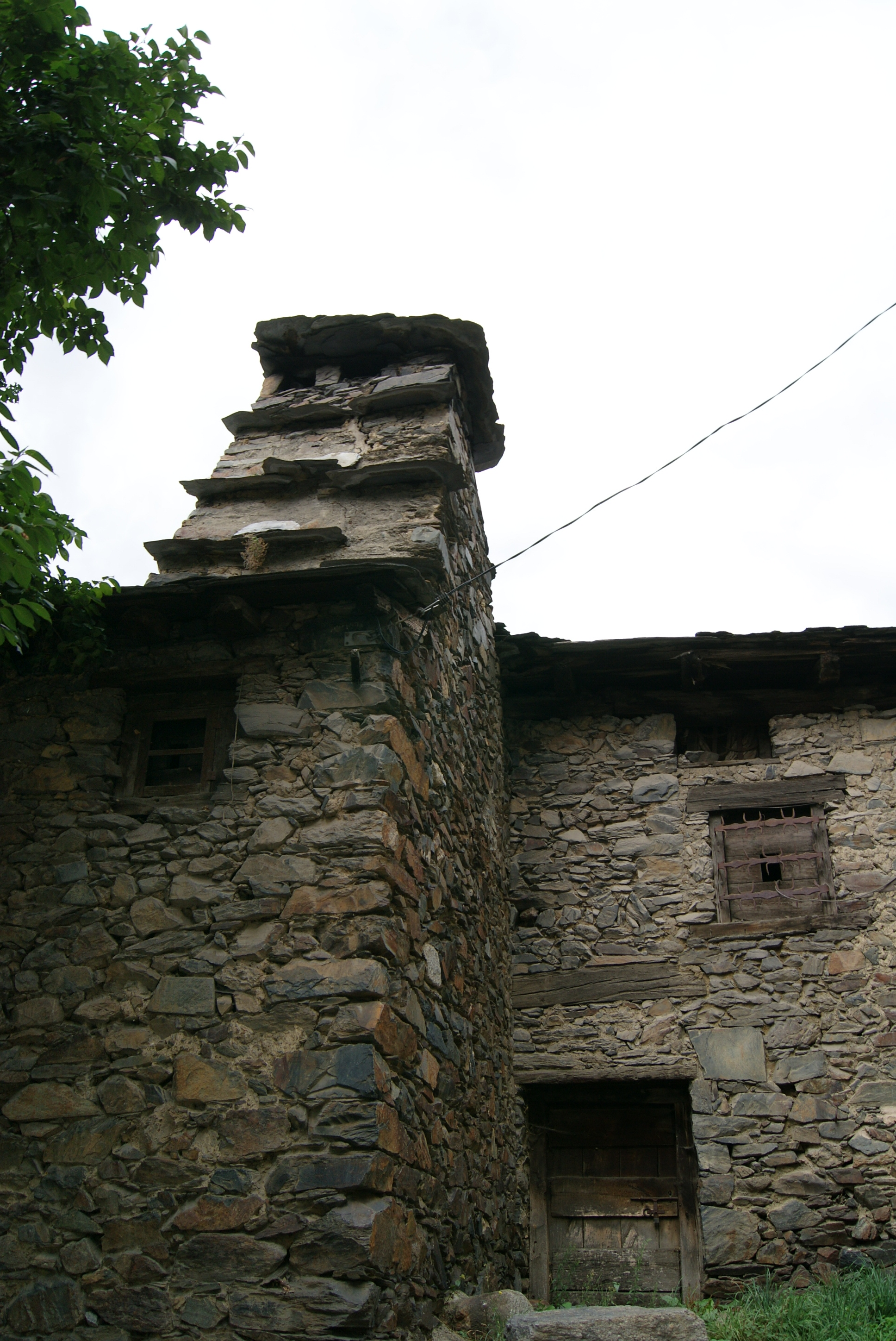
Chimney of Cal Ribot

The oldest part of the house dates to between the 15th and 16th centuries, although the Ribot family report references in family history to a house on the site in the 13th century. A later addition to the west of the house is inscribed 1724.

The house has a T-shaped floor plan. There is a threshing floor below, and a hayloft on the upper floor of the oldest part. There was originally an oven, on the street side, on the south, but the oven protruded from the house and was removed when the road was expanded. The house has a large chimney on the eastern part, with horizontal slabs to prevent rodents from entering. This chimney was used as a model for the restoration of the chimney at Casa de la Vall in the 1960s.
