= Antiga fàbrica de pells =

Andorran Heritage Property

Coordinates: 42.5109°N 1.5463°E

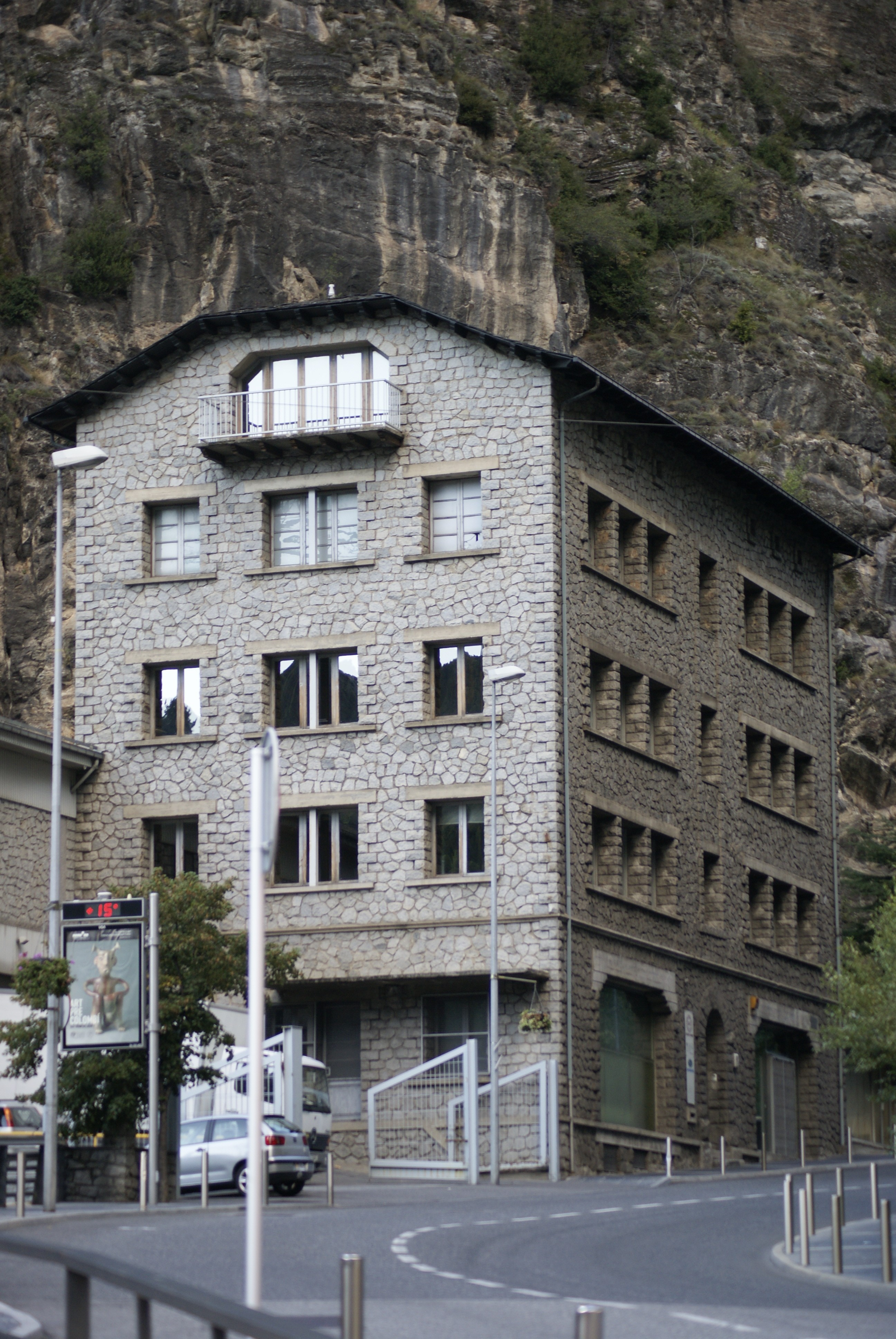
Antiga fàbrica de pells

Antiga fàbrica de pells is a building located at Avinguda Miquel Mateu, 13–15 in Escaldes, Escaldes-Engordany Parish, Andorra. It is a heritage property registered in the Cultural Heritage of Andorra. It was designed by Xavier Pla, and built in 1946. It is heritage listed as a typical granite building of its time, and as a representative of industrial buildings in Andorra.

== History ==
The Antiga fàbrica de pells is a heritage building in Escaldes, Escaldes-Engordany Parish, Andorra that was previously a leather factory. The building dates from 1946, and is constructed from granite. It was designed by architect Xavier Pla. There are two buildings on the site, a rectangular main building, and second almost triangular building. The main building has a basement, ground floor, three further floors and a house. The windows are latticed, and there are seven on each floor, which are all aligned. The building is generally symmetrical. The house has a balcony. The second construction is a single floor, and uses a triangular plan to adapt to the terrain. There are three large doors on the east facade, and an access door on the south. The roof is sloped, and has chamfers to the front and rear, and granite ashlars.

The building was registered for protection on the heritage register of Andorra in July 2004 as being a typical granite building of the years 1930 to 1960, and as a representative of an industrial building that was conceived and built for that purpose.
