= Església de Sant Pere Màrtir, Escaldes-Engordany =

Church in Escaldes-Engordany, Andorra

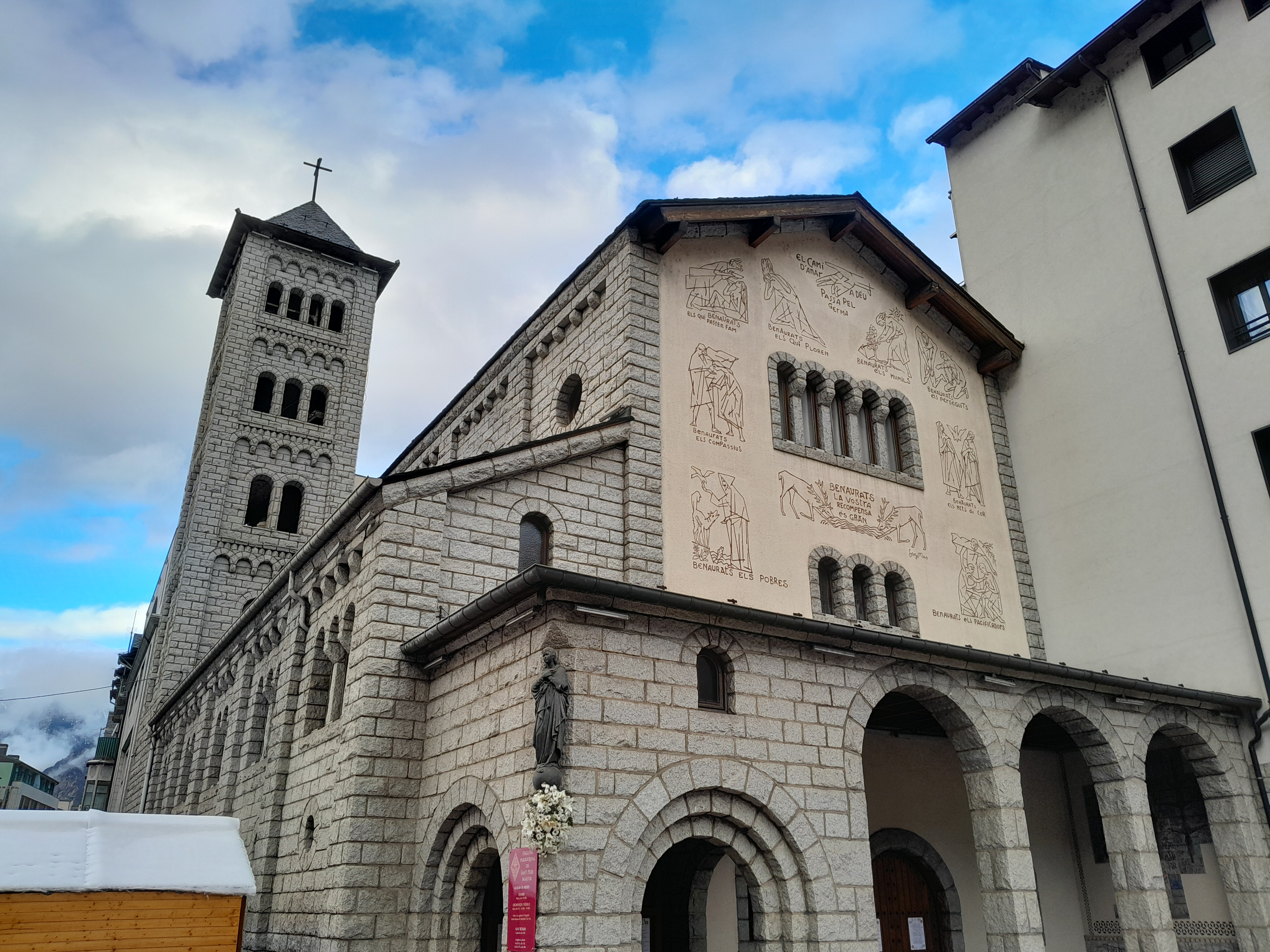
- Església de Sant Pere Màrtir, Escaldes-Engordany
- 42.50888°N 1.54165°E
- Location: Escaldes–Engordany, Andorra
- Country: Andorra
- Denomination: Catholic Church
- Sui iuris church: Latin Church

Architecture
- Architectural type: Romanesque Revival
- Years built: 1956–1981
- Completed: 1981

Església de Sant Pere Màrtir, Escaldes-Engordany is a church located in Escaldes–Engordany, Andorra, that was constructed from 1956 to 1981. It is a heritage property registered in the Cultural Heritage of Andorra. The funeral of Antoni Martí, former prime minister of Andorra, was conducted in this church.

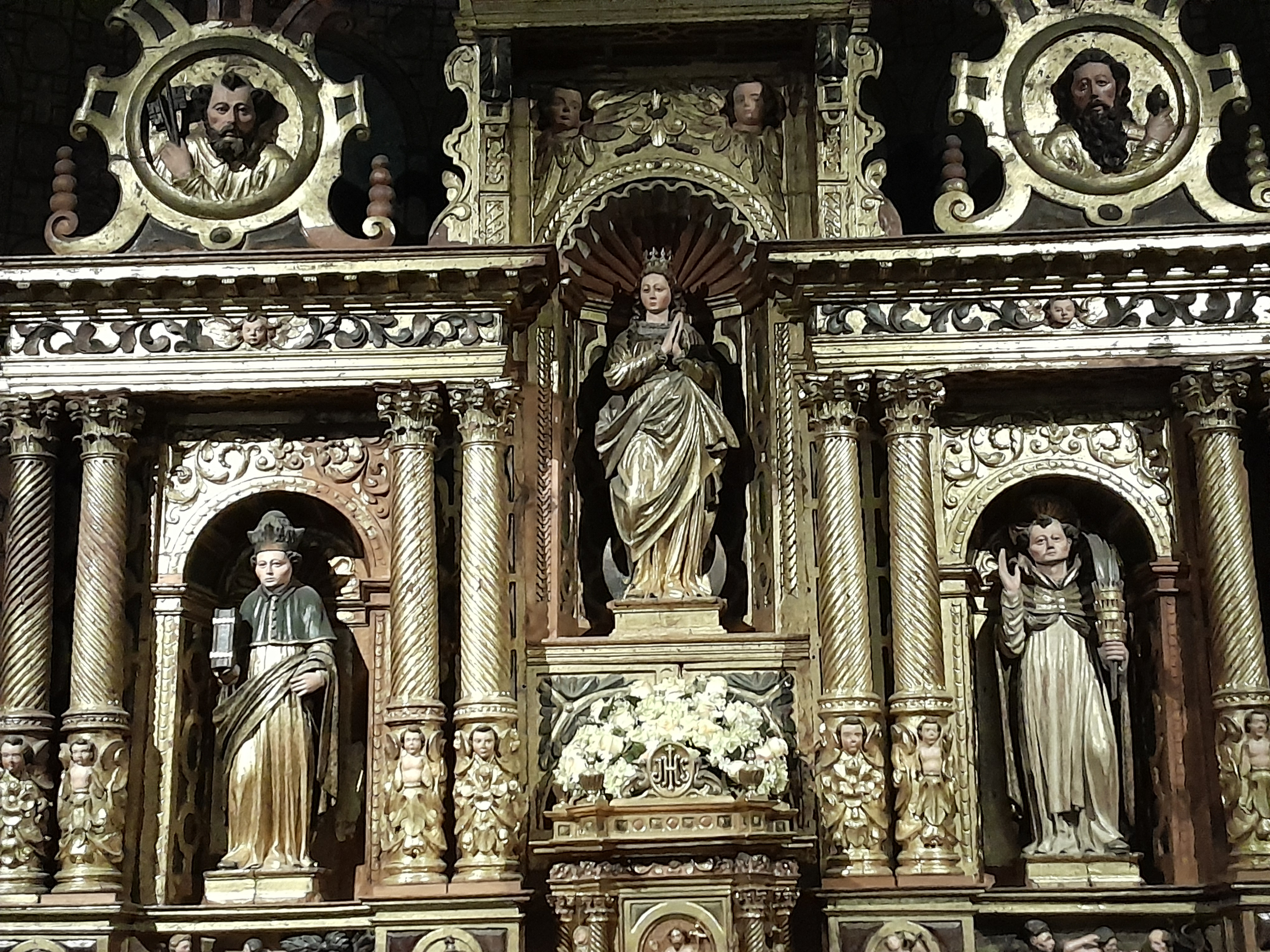
Interior

== History ==
Església de Sant Pere Màrtir, Escaldes-Engordany is located in Escaldes–Engordany, Andorra. The Cultural Heritage of Andorra listed the church as an asset of cultural interest on 16 July 2003. The church was host to the state funeral of Antoni Martí, the former prime minister of Andorra, on 8 November 2023. The funeral was presided by episcopal co-prince Joan Enric Vives i Sicília.

== Structure ==
Conceived by Josep Danés, construction occurred between 1956 and 1981, using Romanesque Revival architecture. It uses a basilica plan with a central nave, two side aisles, a semicircular apse, and a square bell tower. The exterior uses Lombard Romanesque styling.

The Baroque alter piece from a prior church dedicated to Peter of Verona is used in the building. The stained glass in the church was created by members of the Rigalt and Granell families in Barcelona. Episcopal co-prince Joan Martí i Alanis named the three bells in the church Maria, Anna, and Jacoba in 1981. An organ was added to the church in 1988.

== Art ==
Núria Llimona created Romanesque murals for the church that depict 16 figures, who are mostly unidentified saints. A sculpture of the Pietà was created by Josep Viladomat.

== Works cited ==
- "Església de Sant Pere Màrtir". Cultural Heritage of Andorra. Archived from the original on 9 May 2012.
- "Sant Pere Màrtir". Museus. Archived from the original on 30 April 2025.
