= Casa Massip-Dolsa =

Historic house in Andorra la Vella, Andorra

Coordinates: 42°29′30″N 1°29′44″E

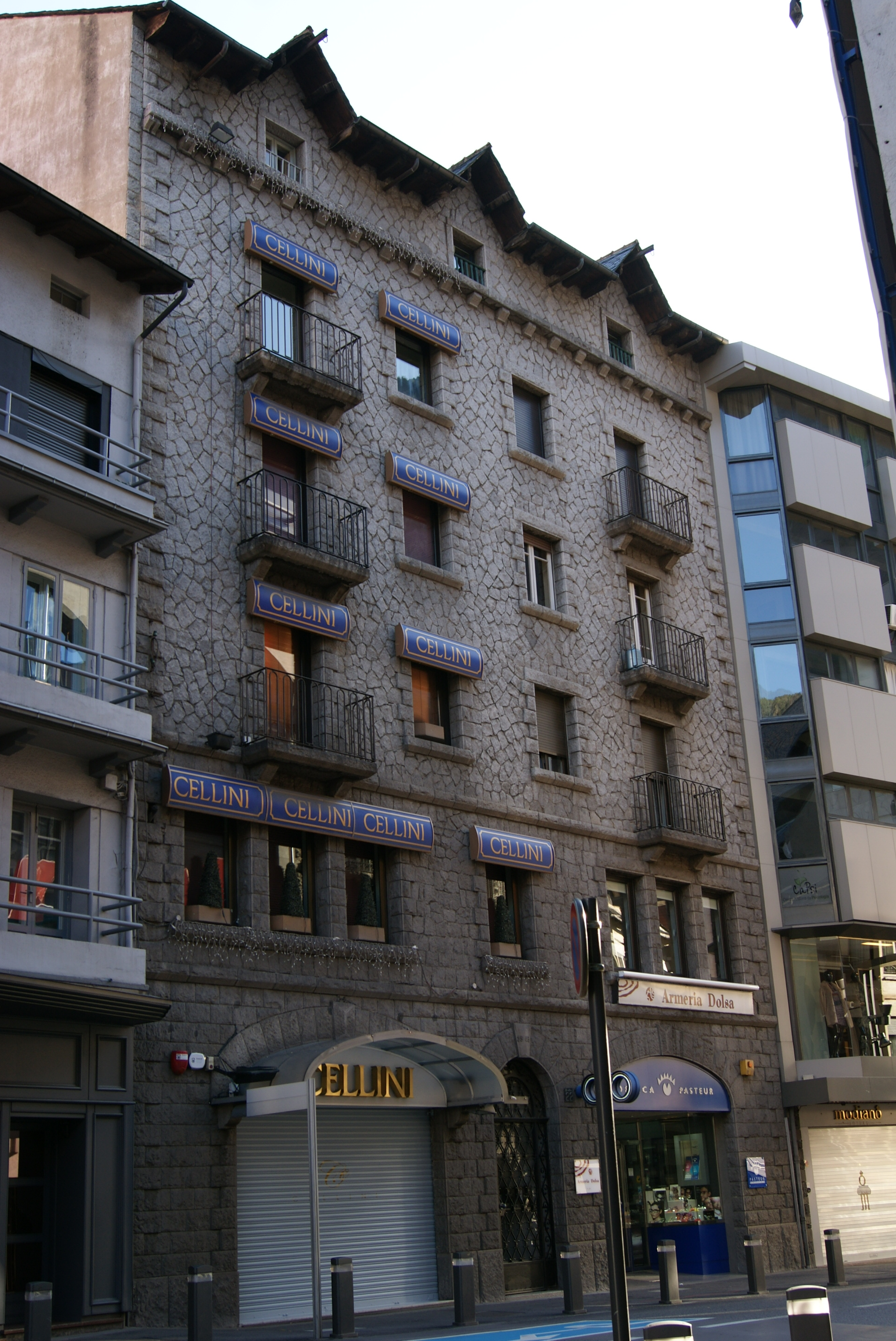
Casa Massip-Dolsa

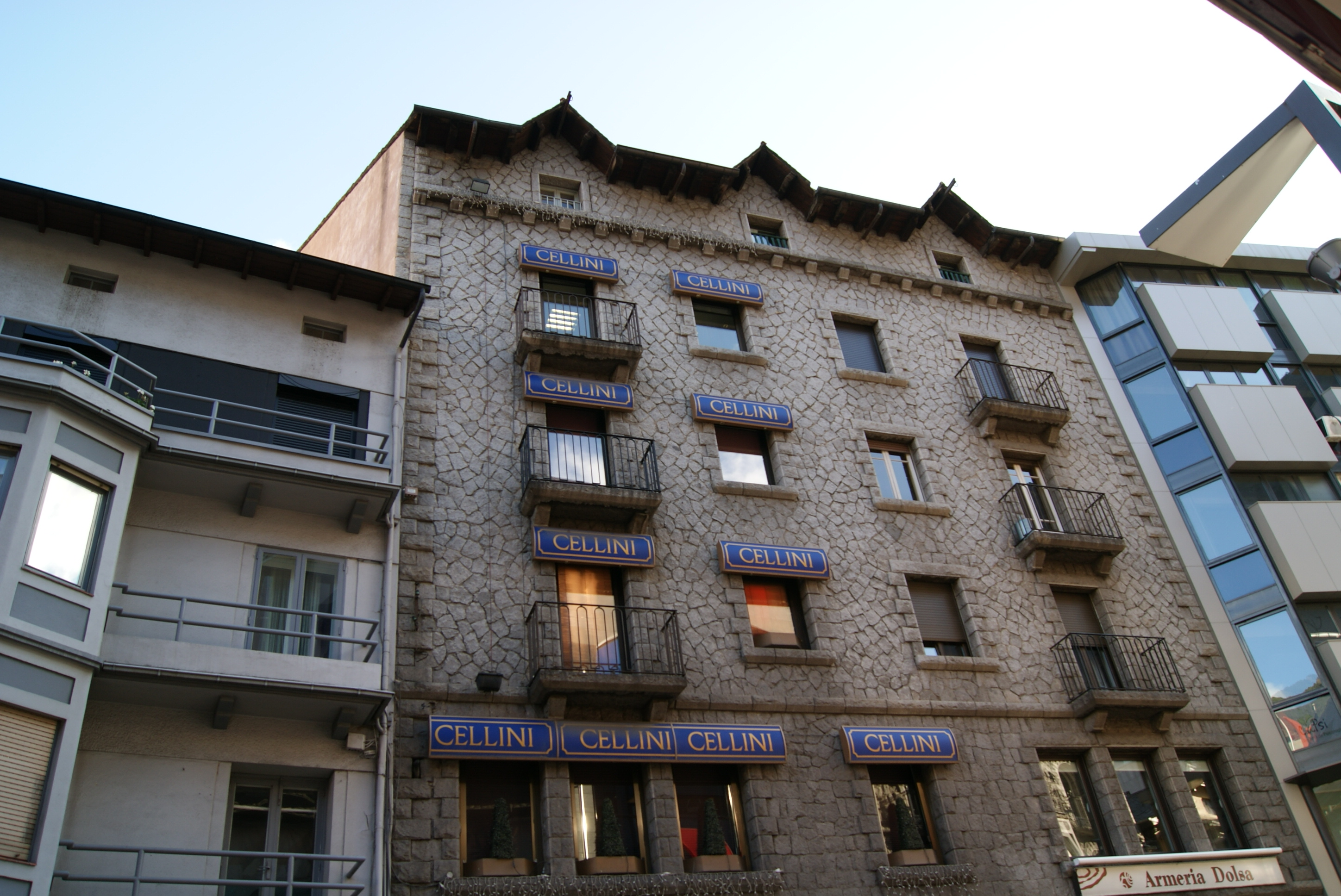
Casa Massip-Dolsa (2)

Casa Massip-Dolsa is a historical house at 22 Avinguda de Meritxell in Andorra la Vella, Andorra. Built in 1938–39, it is registered in the Cultural Heritage of Andorra.
