= Casa dels Russos =

Historic house in Andorra

Coordinates: 42°29′30″N 1°29′44″E

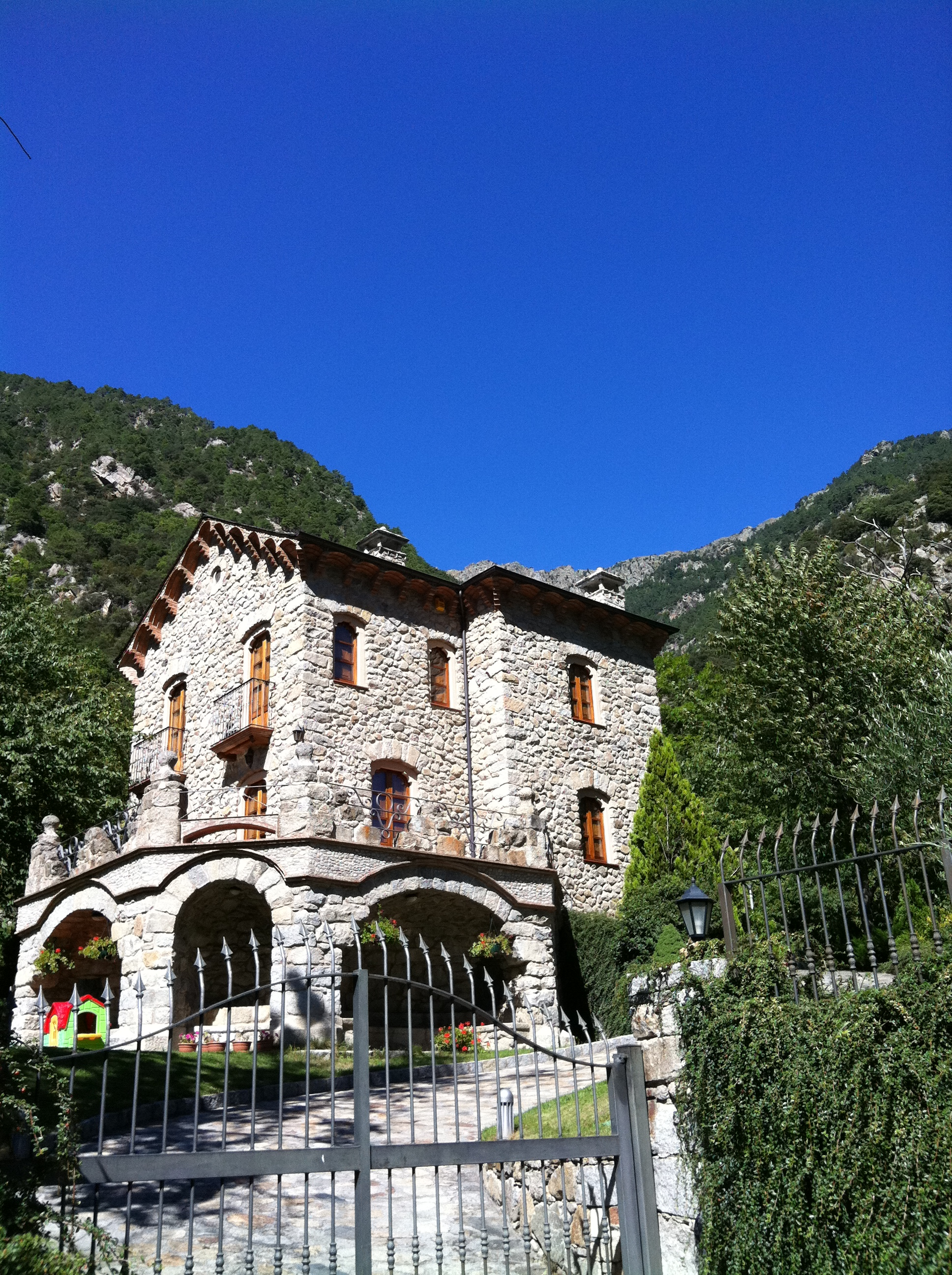
Casa del Russos

Casa dels Russos (House of the Russians) is a historical house in Santa Coloma d'Andorra, Andorra la Vella parish, Andorra. In the early 1930s, it was the residence of the Boris Skossyreff, who styled himself King of Andorra. It is a heritage property registered in the Cultural Heritage of Andorra. Designed by Cesar Martinell, it is built in a combination of Catalan Modernisme and Noucentisme styles.

== See also ==
- Boris Skossyreff
