= Casa Balletbó =

House in Sant Julià de Lòria, Andorra

Coordinates: 42°28′07″N 01°29′36″E

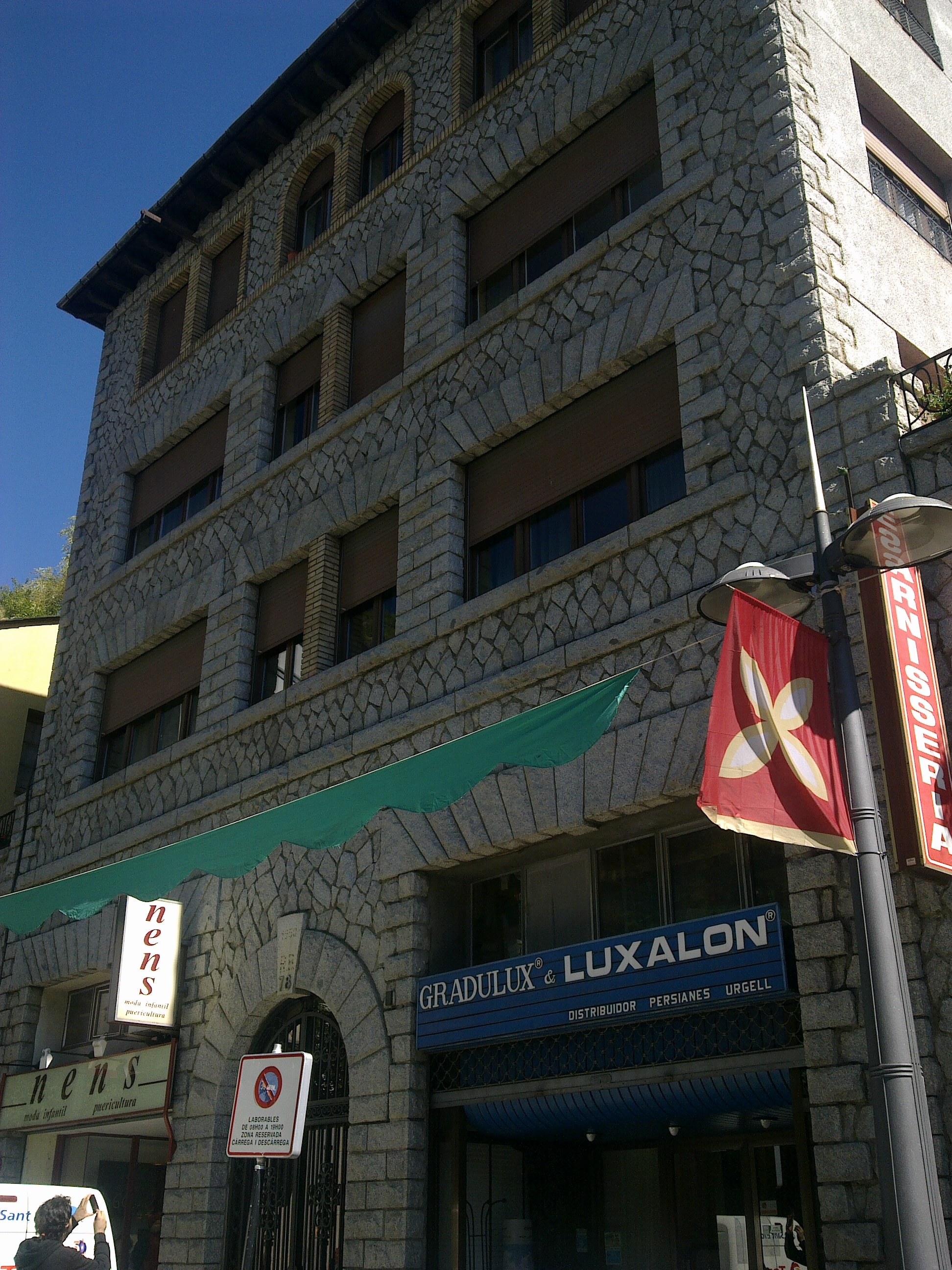
Casa Balletbó

Casa Balletbó is a house located at Avinguda Verge de Canòlic, 78, Sant Julià de Lòria Parish, Andorra. It is a heritage property registered in the Cultural Heritage of Andorra. It was built in 1950.
