= Antiga Vegueria Francesa =

Coordinates: 42.5079°N 1.5239°E

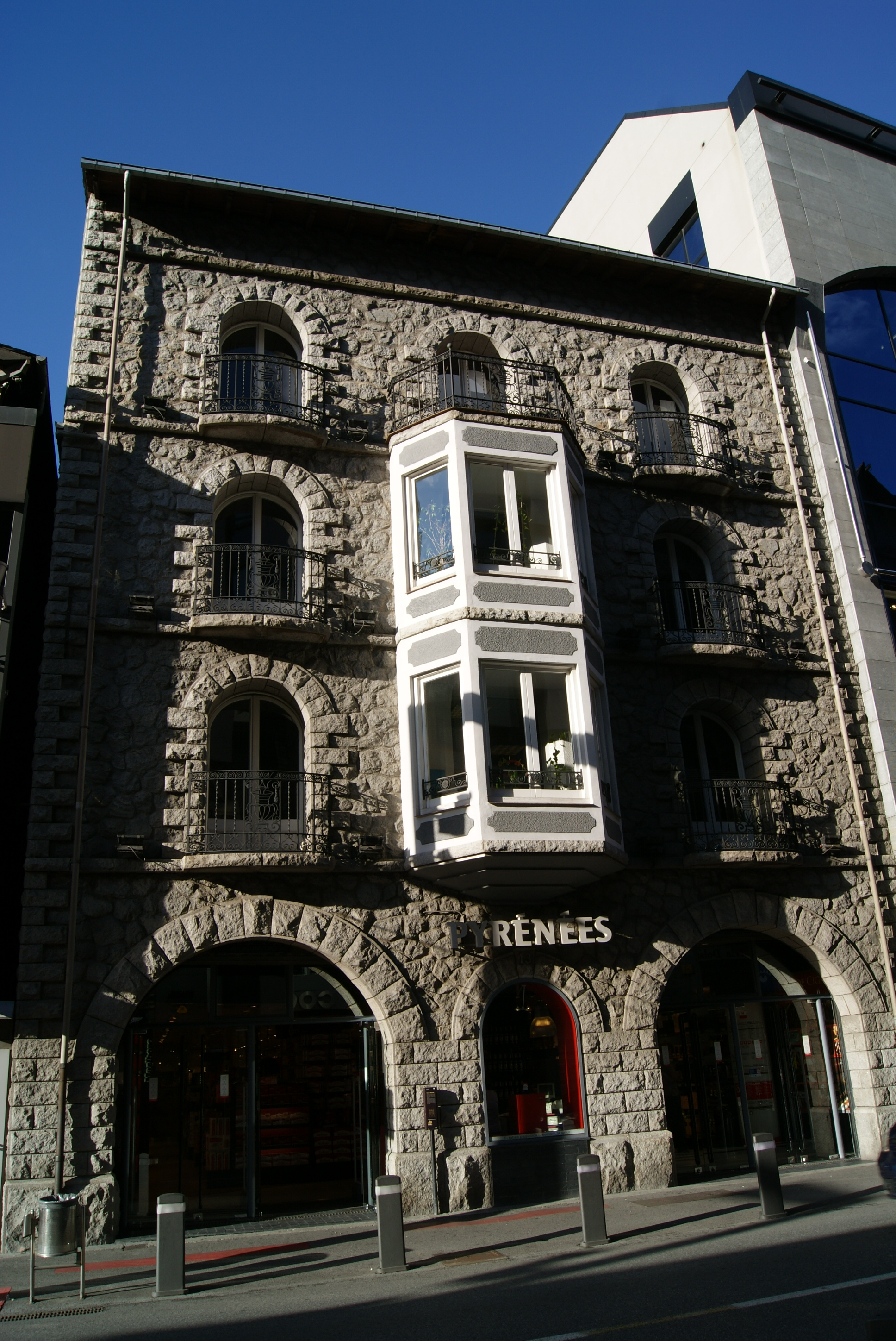
Antiga Vegueria Francesa

Antiga Vegueria Francesa is a historical house located at Avinguda Meritxell, 13 in Andorra la Vella, Andorra. It is a heritage property registered in the Cultural Heritage of Andorra. It was built in 1941.
