= Church of Sant Serni de Canillo =

Church located in Canillo, Andorra

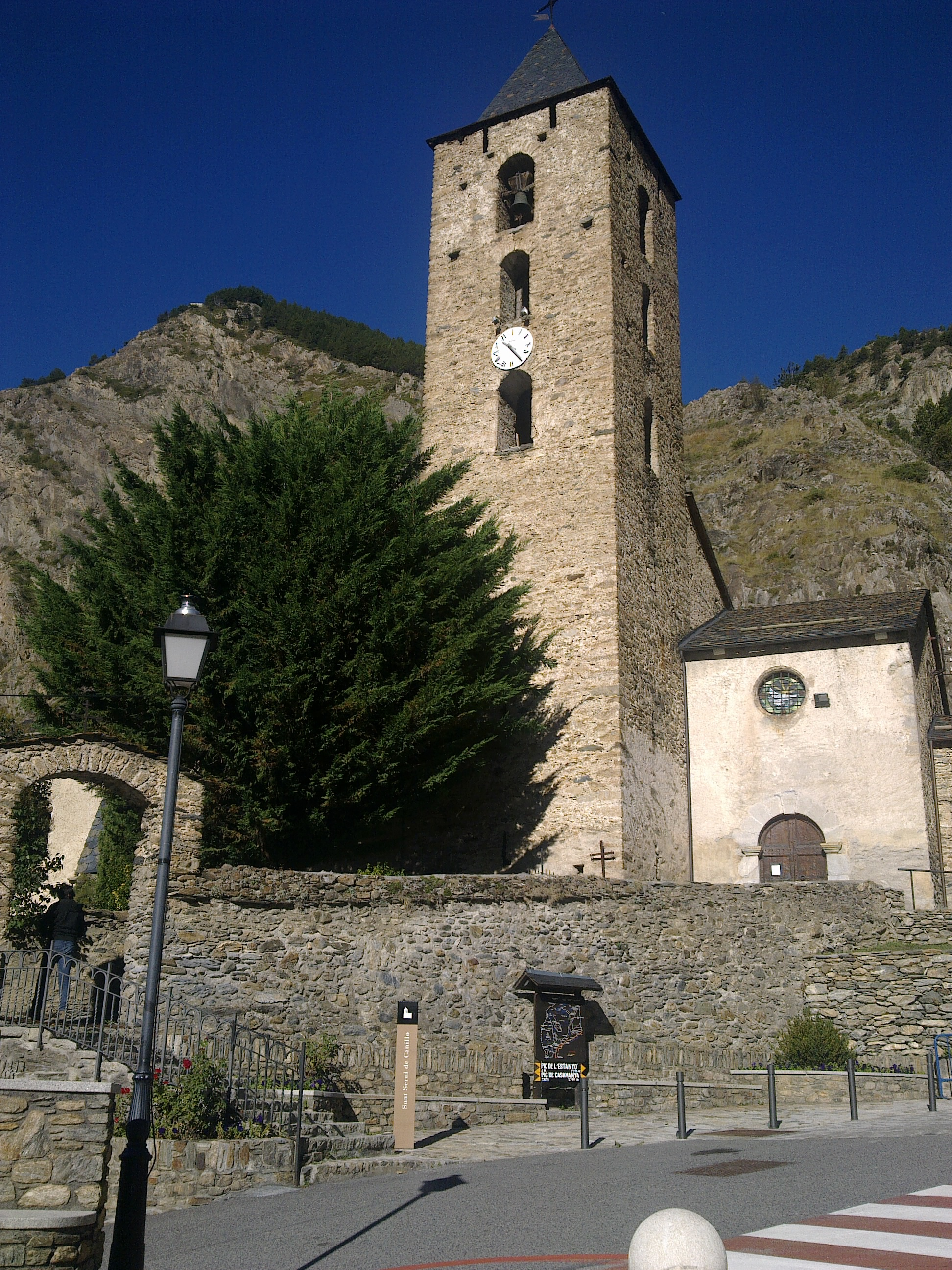
- Church of Sant Serni de Canillo
- 42°34′03″N 1°35′51″E
- Location: Canillo, Andorra
- Country: Andorra
- Denomination: Catholic Church
- Sui iuris church: Latin Church

Architecture
- Architectural type: Romanesque; Baroque

The Church of Sant Serni de Canillo is a church located in Canillo, Andorra, and was constructed in the 17th and 18th centuries. It is a heritage property registered in the Cultural Heritage of Andorra.

A prior church, made using Romanesque architecture, existed where the Church of Sant Serni de Canillo now stands. It has the tallest bell tower in Andorra and there are tombs dating from the 7th to 18th centuries underneath it.

== History ==
Located in Canillo, Andorra, a church in the town was first mentioned in 957. It became a part of the Roman Catholic Diocese of Urgell on 20 June 1083. The Cultural Heritage of Andorra listed the church as an asset of cultural interest on 16 July 2003. In 2009, a series of tombs from the 7th to 18th centuries were discovered during renovations.

== Structure ==
A previous church was constructed at the same premise in the 12th century using Romanesque architecture, major expansions were made to the building in the 17th and 18th centuries using Baroque architecture. Most of the building uses Baroque architecture. The church uses a rectangular floor plan and has a quadrangular apse. It has a gable roof and is three stories tall.

The nave has a wooden ceiling. It has a baroque wooden choir and some furniture dating from the 17th and 18th centuries.

The main altar is dedicated to Saturnin and was constructed in the later half of the 17th century. There are several altarpieces within the chapels including a 17th-century altarpiece dedicated to the Virgin Mary; an 18th-century altarpiece dedicated to the Holy Christ; and a 19th-century altarpiece with a devotion to Saint Anthony. Restoration work was done on the murals in the church in 2019.

=== Bell tower ===
The Church of Sant Serni de Canillo has the tallest bell tower in Andorra, standing at 28.5 meters in height. It is semi-detached and on the south side of the church. The bell in the tower, which weighs 120 kilos, was created in 1833, and was restored in 2024, after suffering two cracks.

== Works cited ==
=== News ===
- "Patrimoni Cultural inicia la restauració de les pintures murals de Sant Serni de Canillo". Bondia. 7 June 2019. Archived from the original on 30 April 2025.
- "Restaurada la campana de l'església de Sant Serni". Radio and Television of Andorra. 14 October 2024. Archived from the original on 30 April 2025.

=== Web ===
- "Església de Sant Serni de Canillo". Cultural Heritage of Andorra. Archived from the original on 9 May 2012.
- "Sant Serni de Canillo". Gran Enciclopèdia Catalana. Archived from the original on 30 April 2025.
- "Sant Serni de Canillo". Museus. Archived from the original on 30 April 2025.
