= Casa Blanca, Ordino =

House in Ordino Parish, Andorra

Coordinates: 42°33′27″N 01°32′17″E

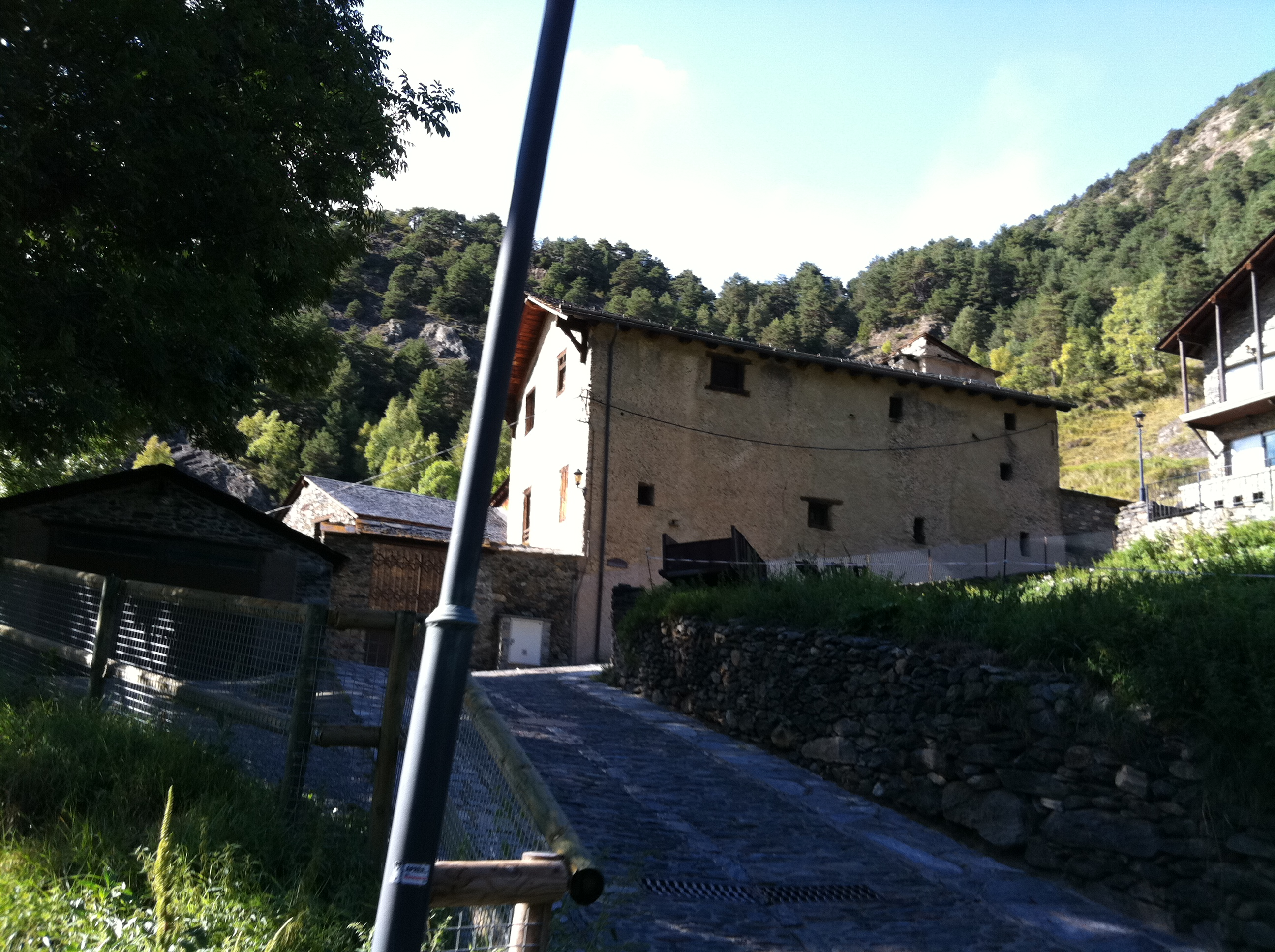
Casa Blanca, Ordino

Casa Blanca is a house located at Segudet, Ordino Parish, Andorra. It is a heritage property registered in the Cultural Heritage of Andorra.
