= Església de Sant Pere del Serrat =

Church in El Serrat, Andorra

Coordinates: 42.6182°N 1.5381°E

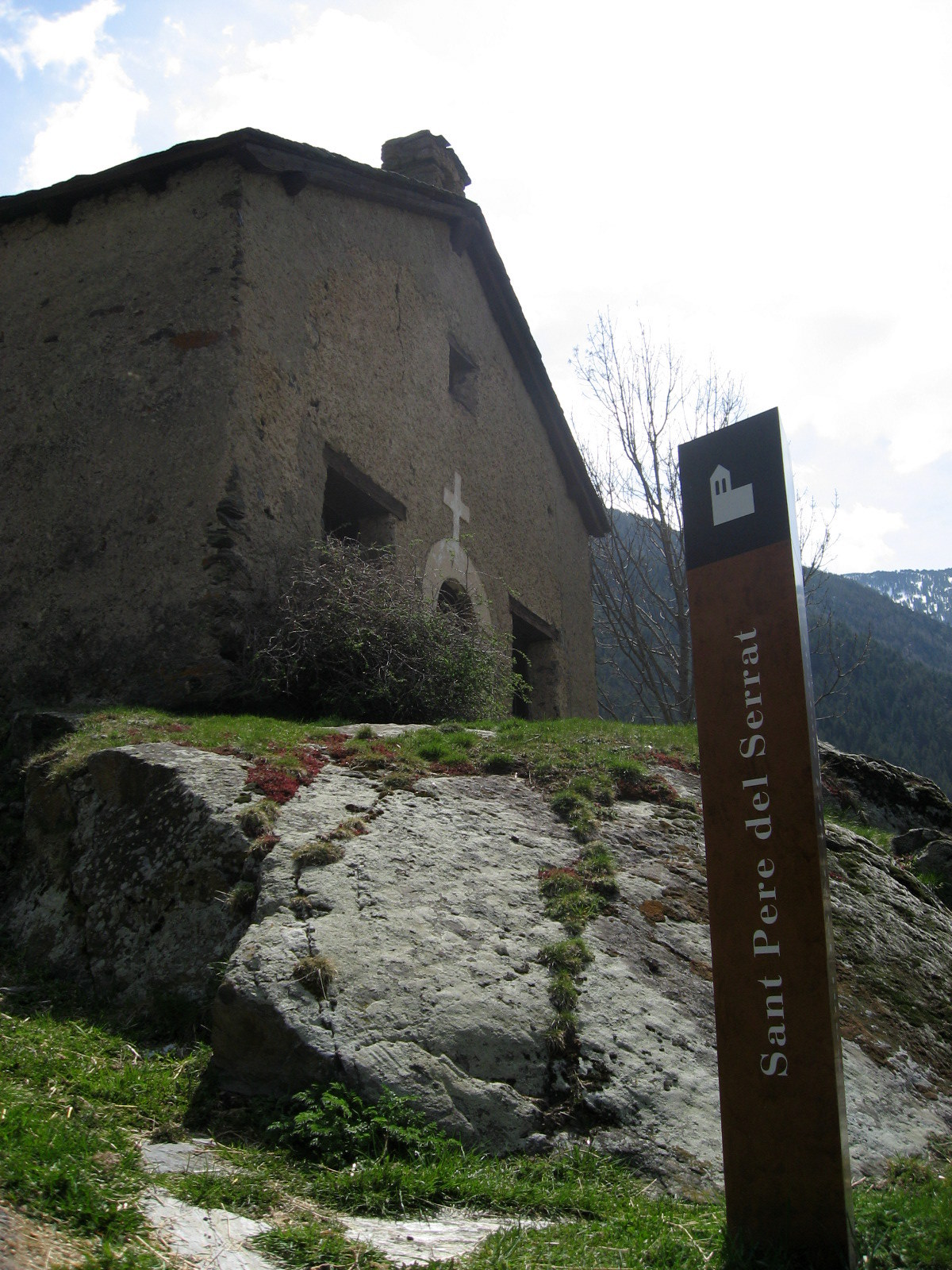
Església de Sant Pere del Serrat

Església de Sant Pere del Serrat is a church located in El Serrat, Ordino Parish, Andorra. It is a heritage property registered in the Cultural Heritage of Andorra. It was built in the 16th-17th century.
