= Església de Sant Iscle i Santa Victòria (Andorra) =

Church in La Massana, Andorra

Coordinates: 42°32′42.1″N 1°30′50.9″E

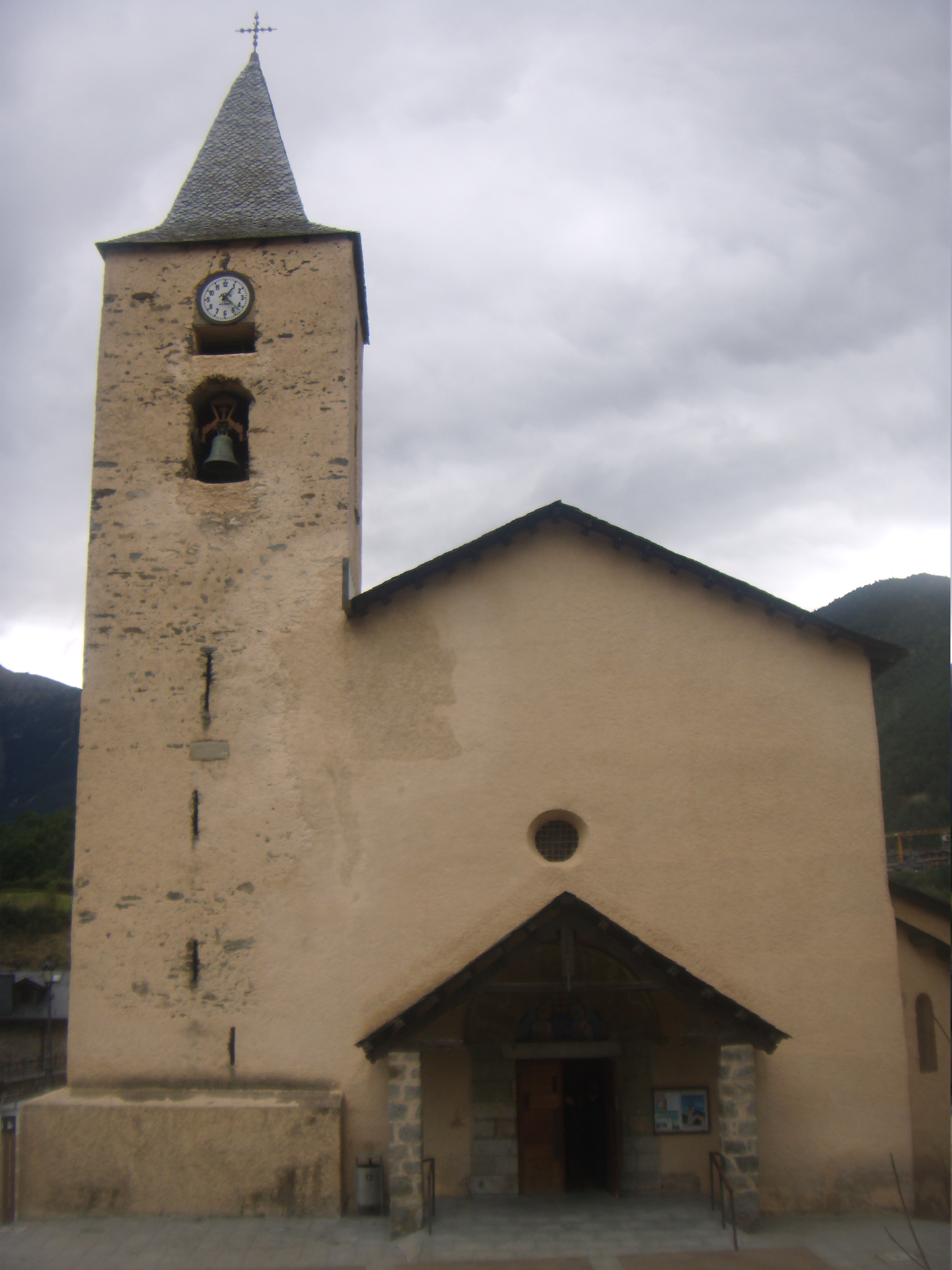
Església de Sant Iscle i Santa Victòria

Església de Sant Iscle i Santa Victòria is a church located on Plaça del Poble in La Massana, Andorra. It is a heritage property registered in the Cultural Heritage of Andorra. It was built in the 17th century.

The bell tower dates from the 19th century. Inside the church are several Baroque altarpieces, with the main altarpiece showing the Virgin of Angels and the two patron saints: Acisclus and Victoria. There are two wooden relic chests, a medieval candelabra, and the baptismal pyre, dating back to Romanesque times.
