= Pont Pla =

Bridge in Escaldes-Engordany, Andorra

Coordinates: 42.5174°N 1.5263°E

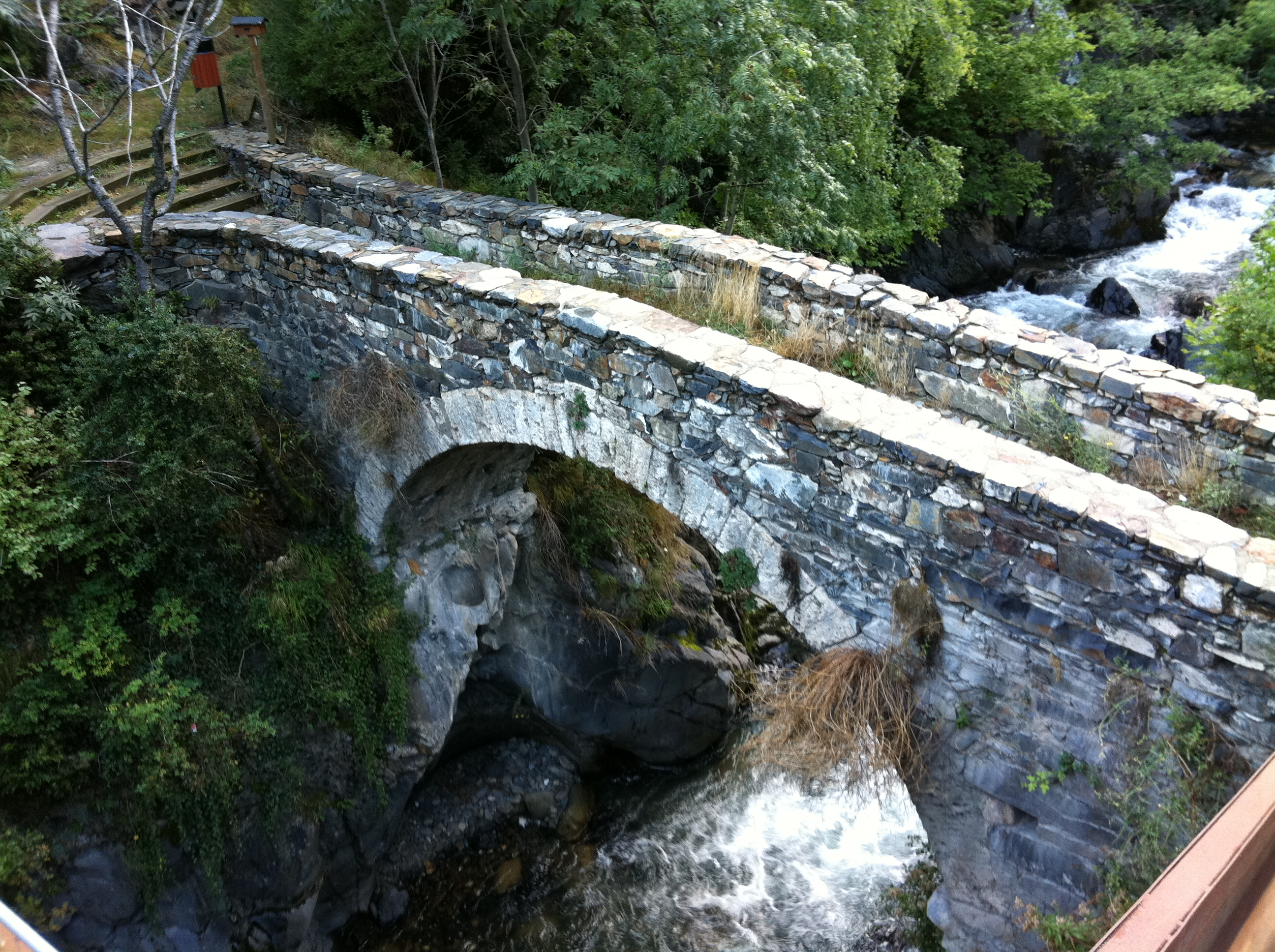
Pont Pla

Pont Pla is a bridge located in Escaldes-Engordany Parish, Andorra. It is a heritage property registered in the Cultural Heritage of Andorra. It was built in the 18th century.
