= Cal Batlle =

House in Ordino Parish, Andorra

Coordinates: 42°34′32″N 1°31′9.8″E

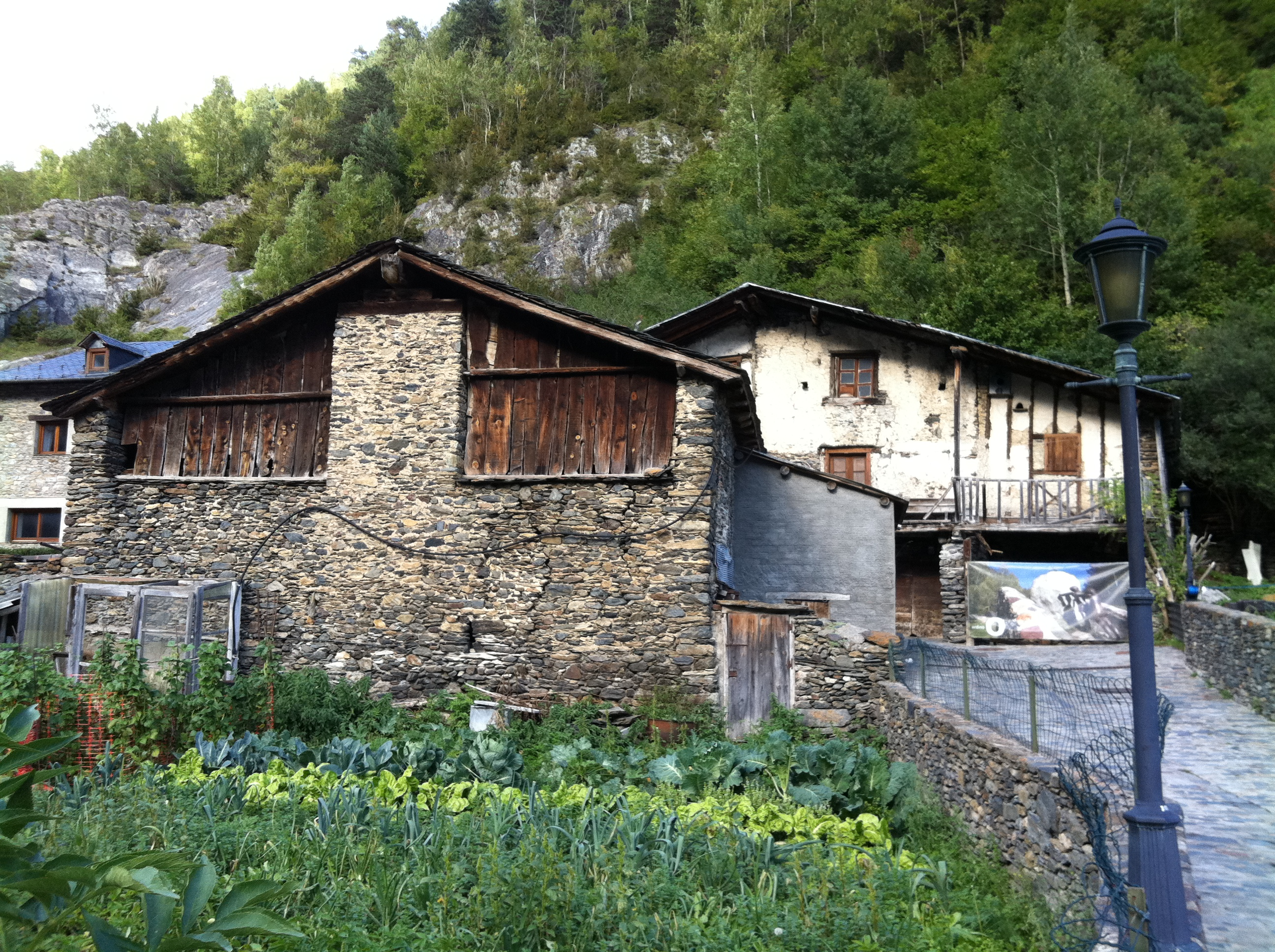
Cal Batlle

Cal Batlle is a house located at La Cortinada, Ordino Parish, Andorra. It is a heritage property registered in the Cultural Heritage of Andorra.
