= Casa del Quart d'Anyós =

Historic house in Anyos, Andorra

Coordinates: 42.534469°N 1.52391°E

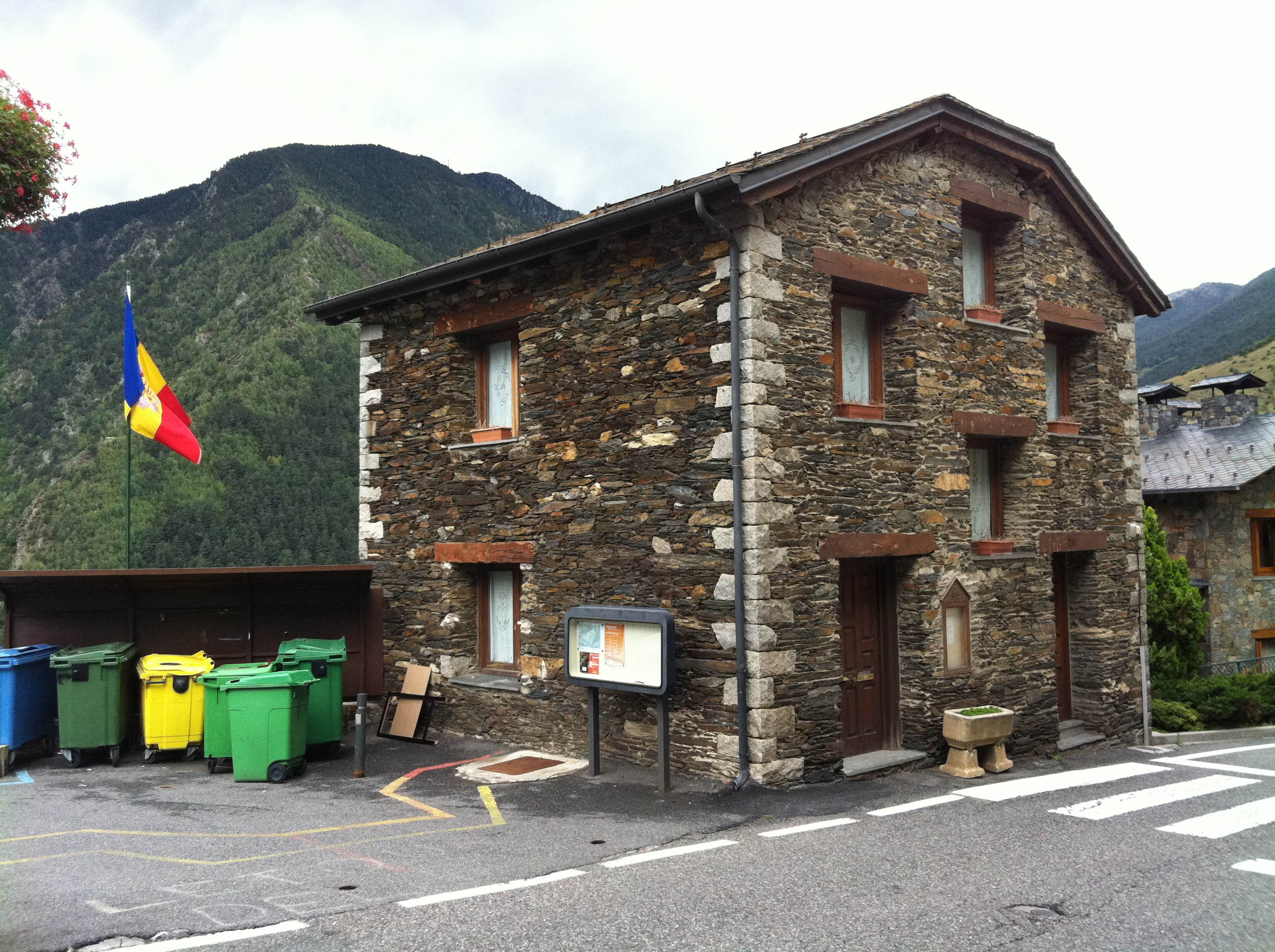
Casa del Quart d’Anyós

Casa del Quart d’Anyós is a house located at Avinguda Sant Cristòfol, Anyós, La Massana Parish, Andorra. It is a heritage property registered in the Cultural Heritage of Andorra. It was built in 1950–51.
