= Casa Lacruz =

House in Escaldes-Engordany, Andorra

Coordinates: 42.5086°N 1.5398°E

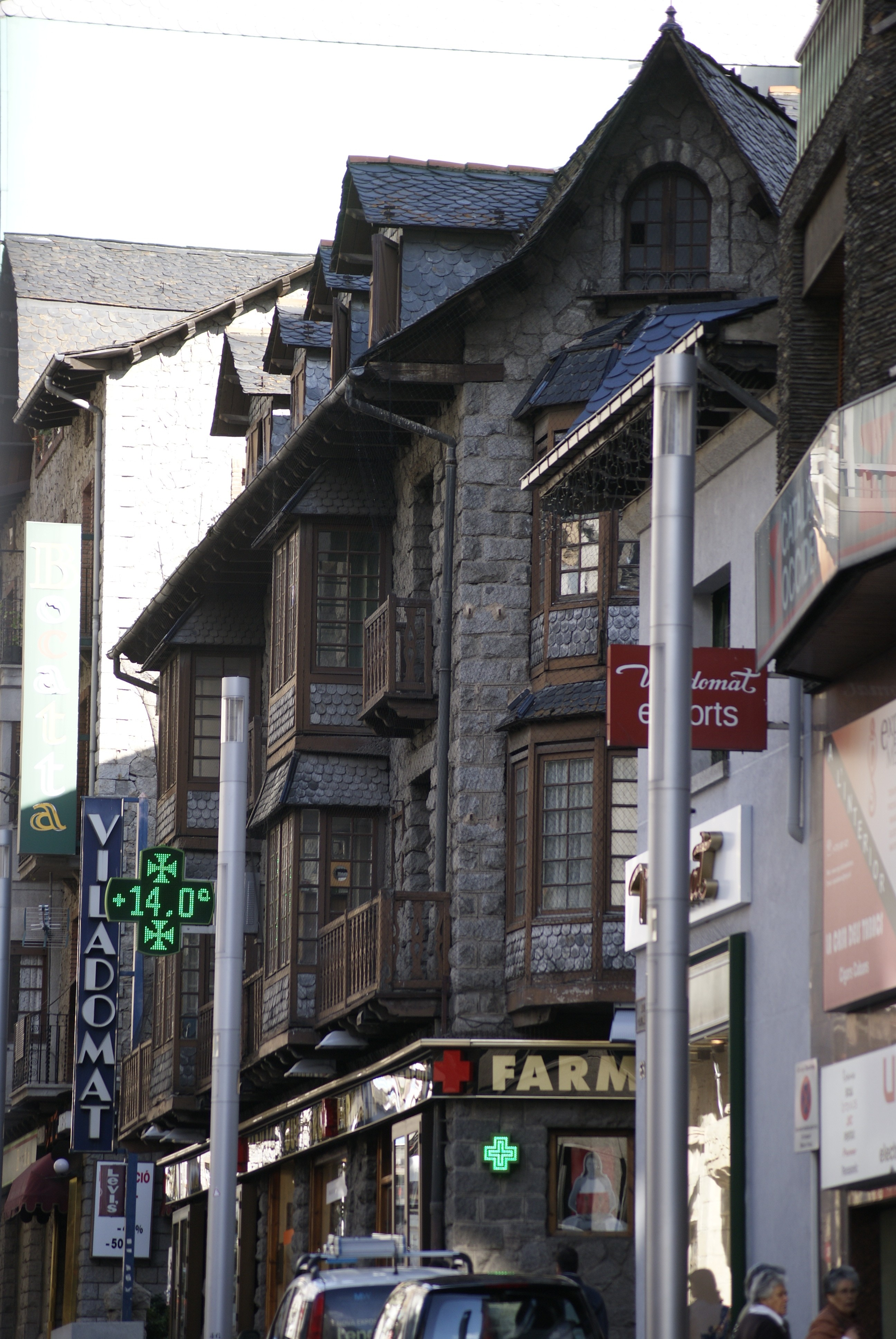
Casa Lacruz

Casa Lacruz is a house located at Avinguda Carlemany, 61, Escaldes, Escaldes-Engordany Parish, Andorra. It is a heritage property registered in the Cultural Heritage of Andorra. It was built in 1940.
