= Església de Santa Bàrbara d'Ordino =

Church in Ordino, Andorra

Coordinates: 42.55556°N 1.52927°E

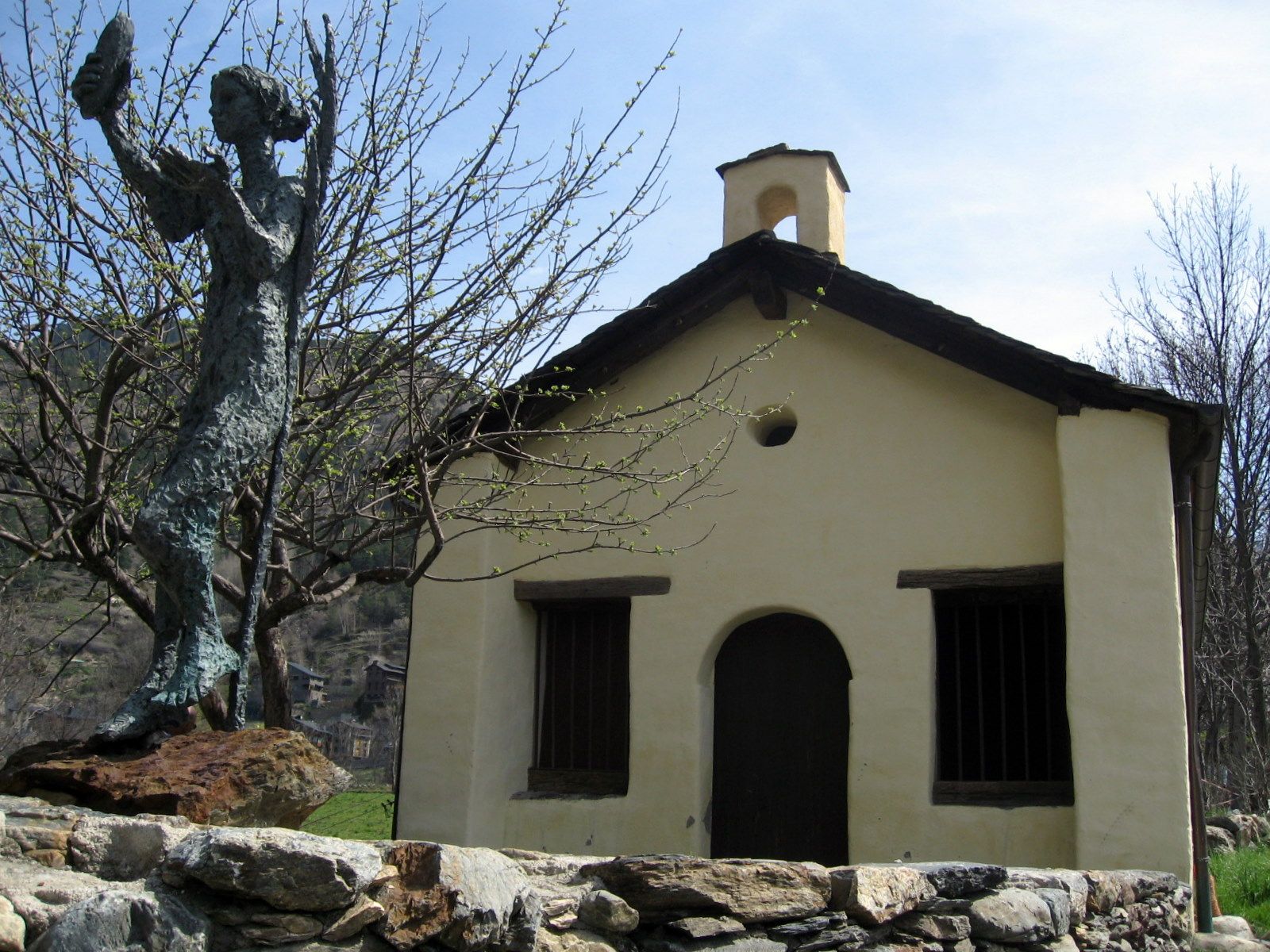
Església de Santa Bàrbara d'Ordino

Església de Santa Bàrbara d'Ordino is a church located in Ordino Parish, Andorra. It is a heritage property registered in the Cultural Heritage of Andorra. It was built in the 17th century.

== History ==
The church is a small rectangular church, built in the 17th century. It is in an isolated location at a crossroads, where the old royal road to Ordino ran. The church faces south-west. There are painted murals in the apse, and traces of rhomboidal geometric decorations in black on red on the north wall. The church underwent restoration between 1997 and 2003. The church has a small bell tower, which is gabled, and was rebuilt in 1998.
