= Església de Sant Miquel de la Mosquera =

Church in Encamp, Andorra

Coordinates: 42.5351°N 1.5818°E

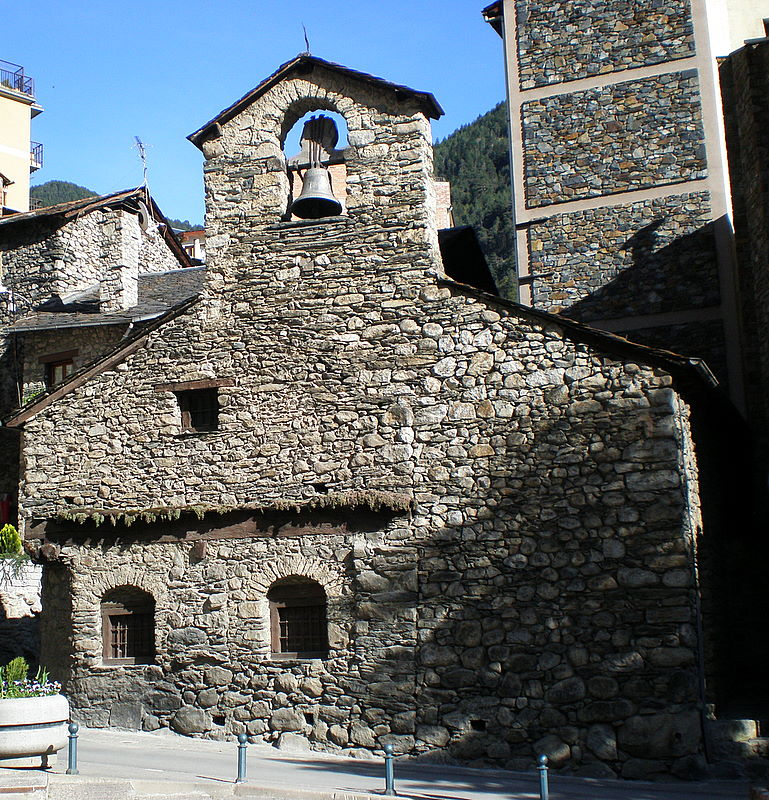
Església de Sant Miquel de la Mosquera

Església de Sant Miquel de la Mosquera is a church located in Encamp, Andorra. It is a heritage property registered in the Cultural Heritage of Andorra. It was built in the 16th century and renovated in the 18th century.
