= Església de la Santa Creu de Canillo =

Church in Canillo, Andorra

Coordinates: 42.5658°N 1.5997°E

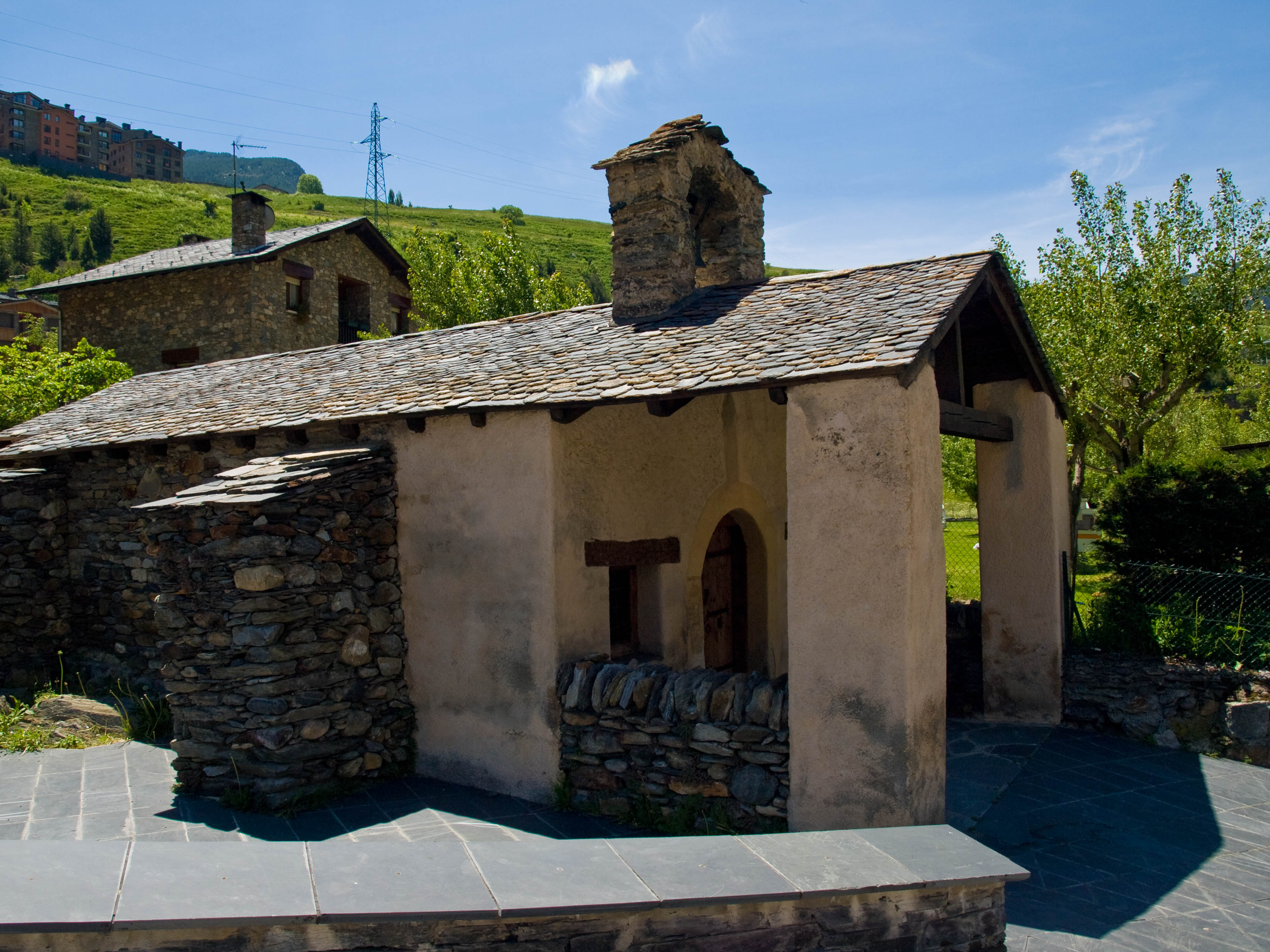
Església de la Santa Creu de Canillo

Església de la Santa Creu de Canillo is a small church located in Canillo, Andorra. It is a heritage property registered in the Cultural Heritage of Andorra. It was built in the 17-18th century.
