= Pont d'Anyós =

Bridge in La Massana, Andorra

Coordinates: 42.5349°N 1.5218°E

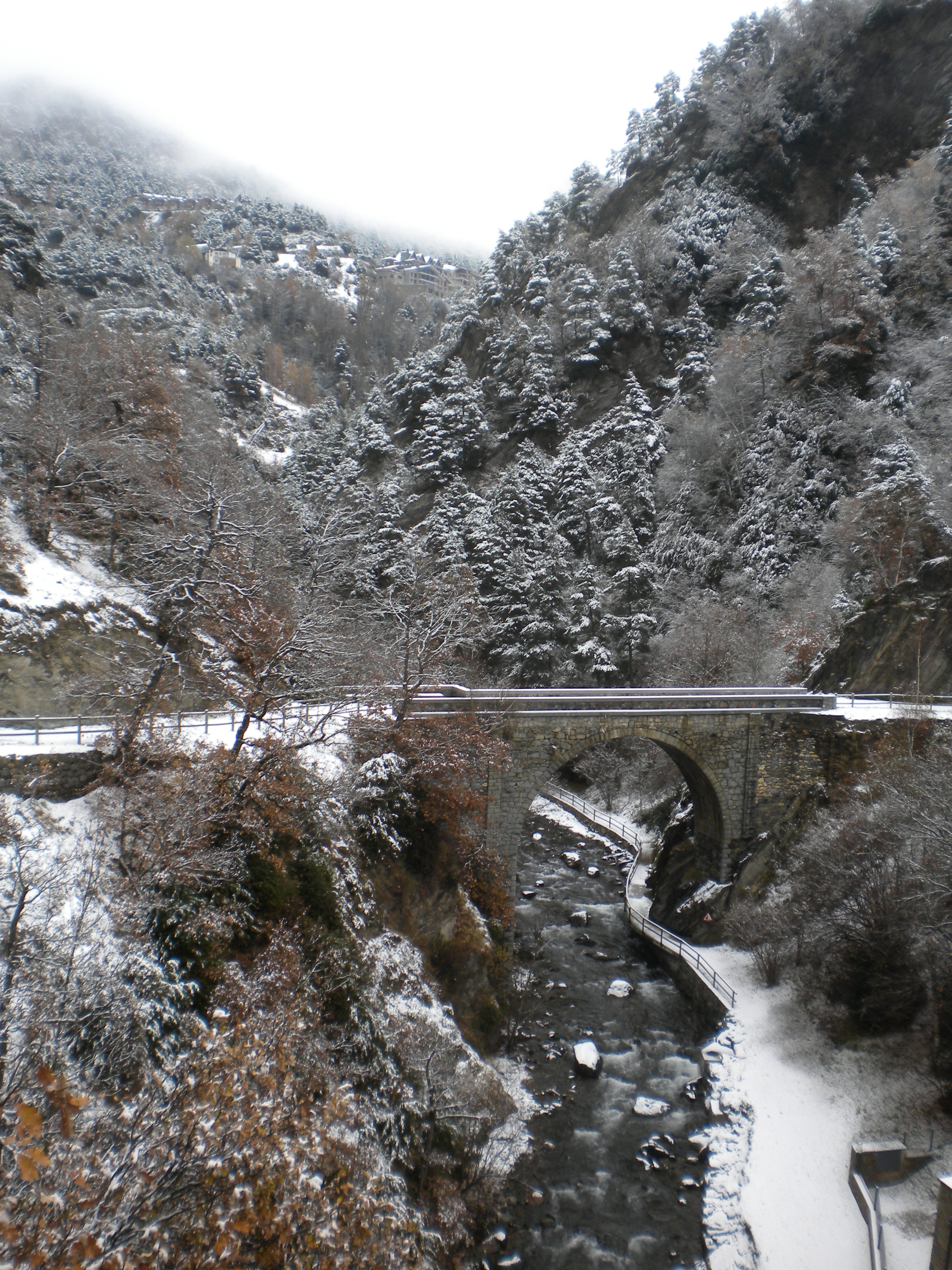
Pont d'Anyós

Pont d'Anyós is a bridge located in La Massana Parish, Andorra. It is a heritage property registered in the Cultural Heritage of Andorra. It was built in 1950–52.
