= Casa Duró =

House in Escaldes-Engordany, Andorra

Coordinates: 42.5086°N 1.5372°E

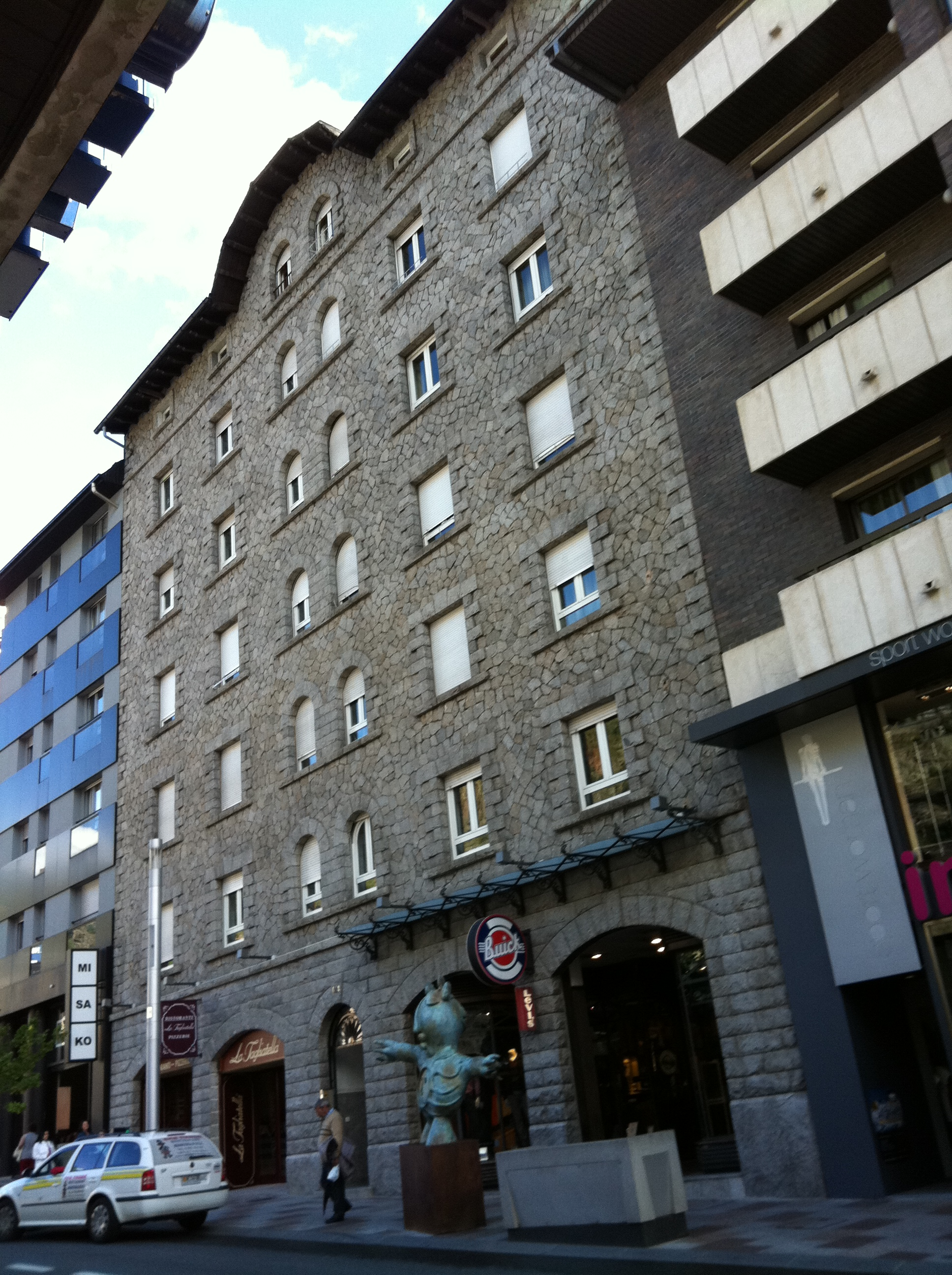
Casa Duró

Casa Duró is a house located at Avinguda Carlemany, 91, Escaldes-Engordany, Andorra. It is a heritage property registered in the Cultural Heritage of Andorra. It was built in 1953–54.
