= Església de Sant Climent de Pal =

Church in Pal, Andorra

- Església de Sant Climent de Pal
- 42°32′46″N 1°28′31″E
- Location: Pal, La Massana, Andorra
- Country: Andorra
- Denomination: Catholic Church
- Sui iuris church: Latin Church

Architecture
- Architectural type: Romanesque

Església de Sant Climent de Pal is a church located in Pal, La Massana, Andorra. The date of construction for the church is unknown, but it was first mentioned in 1312.

== History ==
Believed to have been constructed in the 11th or 12th centuries, Església de Sant Climent de Pal is located in Pal, La Massana, Andorra. There is no documentation of its construction or early existence, but the town of Pal was first mentioned in 1112. The church was under the suffragan bishop of La Massana, but had its own priest and was the only church outside of the six parishes that Archbishop Galceran Sacosta visited in 1312 and 1314. These visits by Sacosta was the first documented mentions of the church. A restoration of the church was done in 1965.

== Structure ==
The church was constructed using Romanesque architecture. The original windows on the south wall are believed to have been bricked up in the 18th century, but were later reopened. The north side of the chapel and altar were cut into the rock due to the local terrain. The current door that exists in the church is lower than the original one. The church's bell tower, which has been mostly unchanged since construction, is unique for Andorra as it uses double twin windows.

The original apse made using Romanesque architecture was largely rebuilt in near the end of the 17th or early 18th centuries. The original apse was semicircular in shape, but the modern apse is a square.

== Art ==
A 113 cm x 51.5 cm polychrome wooden cross from the 12th century hangs on the north wall of the nave. There is a 54 cm tall carving of Mary, mother of Jesus from the 12th century.

== Works cited ==
- "Sant Climent de Pal (La Maçana)". Gran Enciclopèdia Catalana. Archived from the original on 30 April 2025.
- "Sant Climent de Pal". Museus. Archived from the original on 6 April 2025.
