= Casa Bonet (Andorra) =

House in Sant Julià de Lòria Parish, Andorra

Coordinates: 42°28′08″N 01°29′36″E

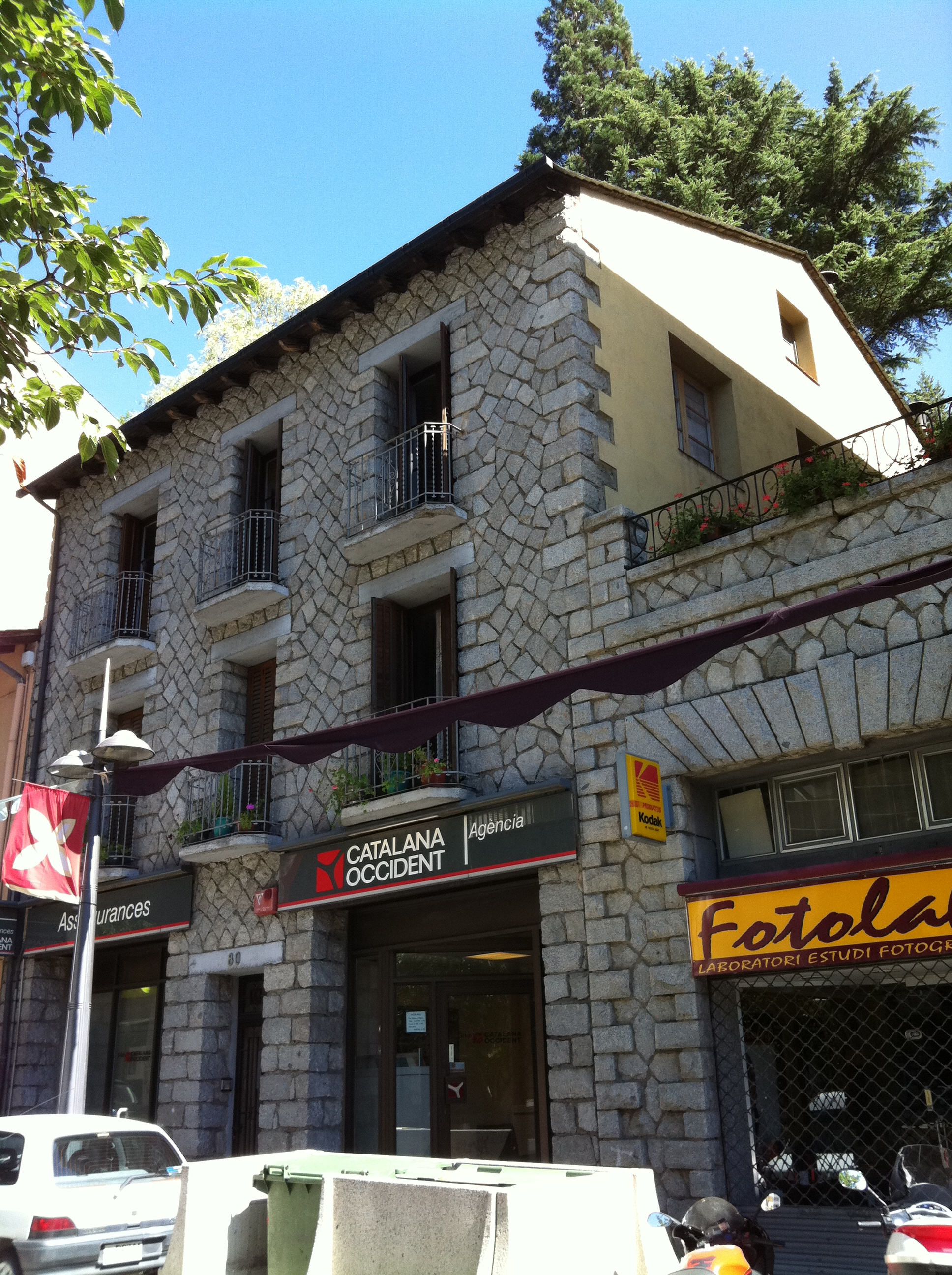
Casa Bonet

Casa Bonet is a house located at Avinguda Verge de Canòlic, 80, Sant Julià de Lòria Parish, Andorra. It is a heritage property registered in the Cultural Heritage of Andorra. It was built in 1947–1949.
