= Església de Sant Esteve =

Church in Andorra la Vella, Andorra

Coordinates: 42°30′26″N 1°31′18″E

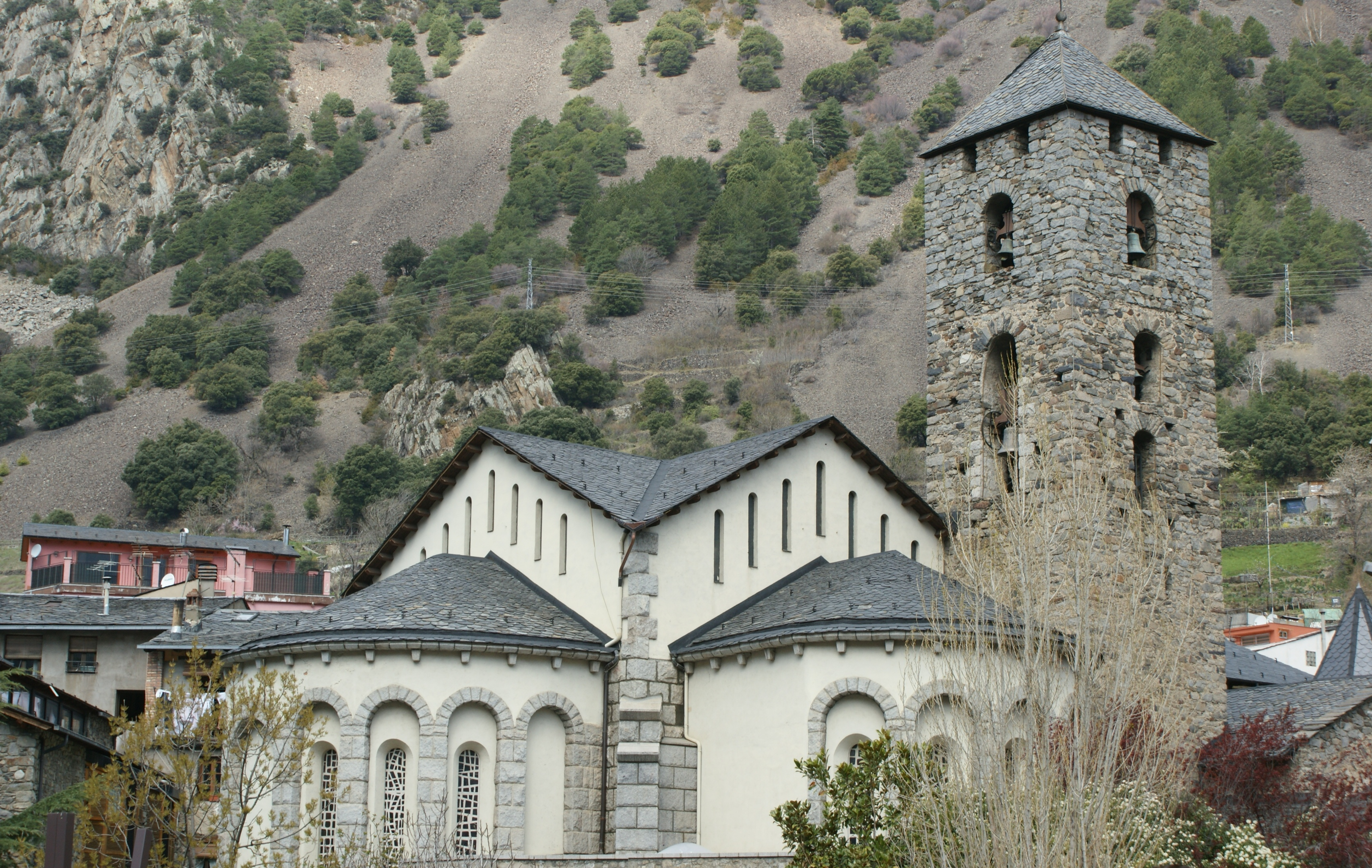
Església de Sant Esteve

Església de Sant Esteve is a Roman Catholic church located on Plaça del Príncep Benlloch in Andorra la Vella, Andorra. It is a heritage property registered in the Cultural Heritage of Andorra.

== History ==
The church was built in the 11th-12th century in a Romanesque style. It has been restored a number of times over the centuries, most notably in the 20th century. The church retains its original Romanesque semi-circular apse, the largest in the principality, and 12th century altarpiece.

Restorations were made in the 1940s by architect Josep Puig i Cadafalch, who remodelled the bell tower and side entrance. In the 1960s, a new nave was constructed.

The church is registered in Andorra's register of cultural monuments - known as "Bé d'interès cultural".

== Art ==
The church was originally home to a number of frescoes, which were mostly removed in the early 20th century. The remaining paintings are now housed in the Museu Nacional d'Art de Catalunya in Barcelona and Espai Columba These images include The Marriage of Cana, and Christ before Pilate. In addition to this, there are additional fragments of the frescoes preserved in the Museo del Prado. Some fragments of frescoes remain on the walls, these however are faded.

The church currently houses two baroque altarpieces of Saint John the Baptist and Saint Lucy, which display the skillful use of baroque woodcarving and depict a number of scenes from Christian theology. In addition to this, there is an 18th-century painting entitled "The Picture of Souls" by Joan Casanoves i Ricart.
