= Andorra =

Microstate in Southern Europe

Principality of Andorra Principat d'Andorra (Catalan)
- Flag Coat of arms
- Motto: Virtus, unita, fortior (Latin) "Virtue united is stronger"
- Anthem: El Gran Carlemany "The Great Charlemagne"
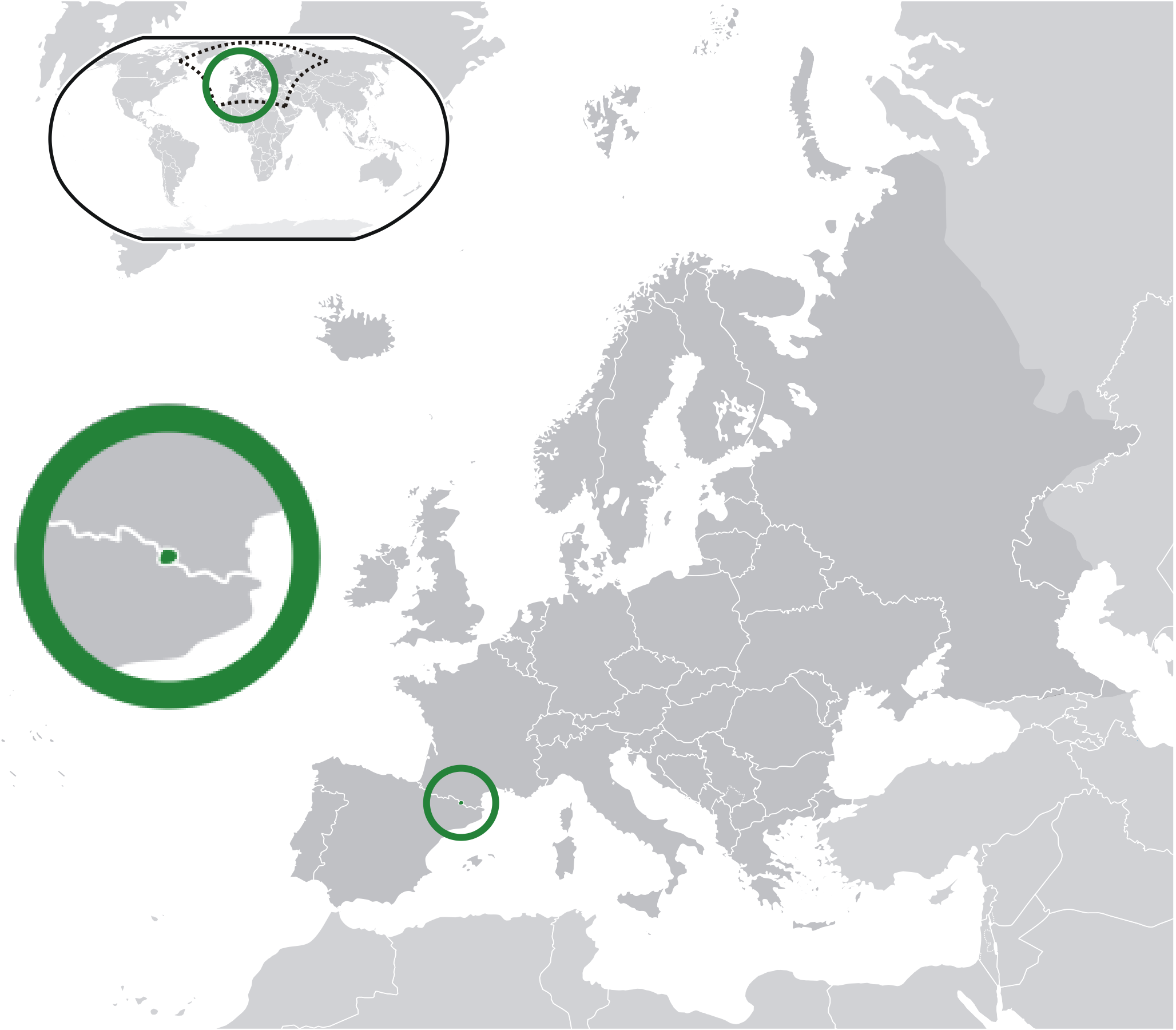
- Location of Andorra (centre of green circle) in Europe (dark grey)
- Capital and largest city: Andorra la Vella; 42°30′23″N 1°31′17″E
- Official languages: Catalan
- Religion (2025): 90.8% Christianity; 85.5% Catholicism; 5.3% other Christian; 6.9% no religion; 2.3% others
- Demonyms: Andorran
- Government: Unitary parliamentary co-principality
  - Co-princes: Josep-Lluís Serrano Pentinat; Emmanuel Macron
  - Personal representatives: Eduard Ibáñez; Frédéric Rose
  - Head of government: Xavier Espot Zamora
  - Syndic general: Carles Ensenyat Reig
- Legislature: General Council

Independence
  - First Paréage: 8 September 1278
  - From the Kingdom of France: 12 October 1652
  - From the Principality of Catalonia: 1715
  - From the French Empire: 1814
  - Constitution: 4 May 1993 (effective)

Area
  - Total: 468 km^{2} (181 sq mi) (179th)
  - Water (%): 0.43

Population
  - July 2026 estimate: ▲90,021 (184th)
  - Density: 192.4/km^{2} (498.3/sq mi) (73rd)
- GDP (PPP): 2026 estimate
  - Total: ▲$6.932 billion (168th)
  - Per capita: ▲$75,988 (23rd)
- GDP (nominal): 2026 estimate
  - Total: ▲$4.879 billion (159th)
  - Per capita: ▲$53,475 (24th)
- Gini (2024): ▼38.4 medium inequality
- HDI (2023): ▲0.913 very high (32nd)
- Currency: Euro (€) (Note: Before 1 January 2002, the Spanish peseta and French franc circulated de facto in Andorra; they were replaced by euro banknotes and coins on that date.) (EUR)
- Time zone: UTC+01:00 (CET)
  - Summer (DST): UTC+02:00 (CEST)
- Date format: dd/mm/yyyy
- Calling code: +376
- ISO 3166 code: AD
- Internet TLD: .ad (Note: Also .cat, shared with the other Catalan-speaking territories.)

Andorra, (Note: Pronunciation: English: /ænˈdɔːrə/ an-DOR-ə or /ænˈdɒrə/ an-DORR-ə; Catalan: [anˈdɔra] or locally [anˈdora]) officially the Principality of Andorra, (Note: Catalan: Principat d'Andorra, pronounced [pɾinsiˈpad danˈdɔra]) is a landlocked country on the Iberian Peninsula, in the eastern Pyrenees in southwestern Europe, bordered by France to the north and Spain to the south. Believed to have been created by Charlemagne, Andorra was ruled by the count of Urgell until 988, when it was transferred to the Diocese of Urgell. Andorra was formed as a polity by a charter in 1278, being a lordship within the Principality of Catalonia until 1715. It is currently headed by two co-princes: the Bishop of Urgell in Catalonia, Spain, and the president of France. Its capital and largest city is Andorra la Vella.

Andorra is the sixth-smallest state in Europe and the largest of the European microstates, with an area of 468 square kilometres (181 sq mi) and an estimated population of 90,021 as of July 2026. The Andorran people are a Romance group descended from the Catalans. Andorra is the world's 17th-smallest country by land and 11th-smallest by population. Its capital, Andorra la Vella, is the highest capital city in Europe, at an elevation of 1,023 metres (3,356 feet) above sea level. The sole official language is Catalan, while Spanish, Portuguese and French are also used.

Tourism in Andorra brings approximately 8 million visitors to the country annually. Andorra is not a member state of the European Union. It has been a member of the Council of Europe and of the United Nations since 1993.

== Etymology ==
The origin of the name Andorra is uncertain. Its earliest known occurrence is in a surviving copy of a lost document from 843. A document from 903 applies the name both to the valley and to a smaller local district within it. Medieval records also contain occasional variants such as Annora, Annorra, Anorra, Endore and Norra. Several explanations of the name have been proposed, but the linguist Joan Coromines concluded that the surviving evidence did not permit a definitive etymology.

One longstanding hypothesis connects the name with the Andosini. The Greek historian Polybius mentions them in his Histories (3.35.2), listing them among the peoples subdued by Hannibal between the Ebro and the Pyrenees in 218 BC. They have traditionally been associated with the Andorran valleys because of the similarity between the names and their presumed position along Hannibal's route. More recent research, however, has highlighted phonetic difficulties and noted that his likely route did not pass through the valleys. Another proposal places Andorra in a pre-Roman or at least pre-Romance series of Pyrenean place names associated with significant springs or other water sources. A 2022 study associated this hypothesis with the thermal springs at Escaldes and suggested that the name originally referred to an area around present-day Andorra la Vella before extending to the valleys as a whole. It nevertheless acknowledged that the hypothesis remained inconclusive.

== History ==
=== Prehistory ===
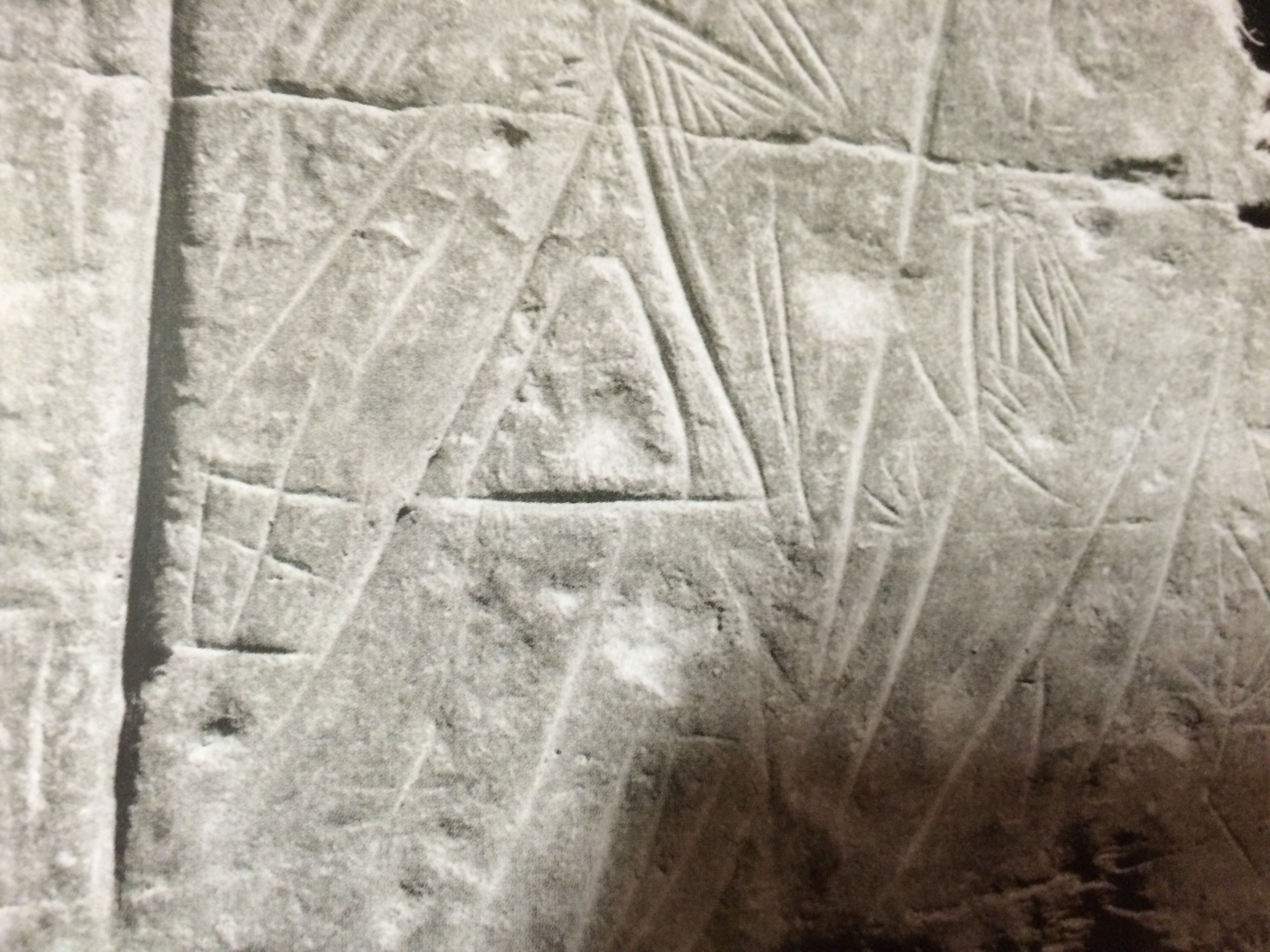
Roc de les Bruixes prehistorical sanctuary in Canillo (detail)

La Balma de la Margineda, found by archaeologists at Sant Julià de Lòria, was settled in 9500 BC as a passing place between the two sides of the Pyrenees. The seasonal camp was perfectly located for hunting and fishing by the groups of hunter-gatherers from Ariege and Segre.

During the Neolithic, a group of people moved to the Valley of Madriu as a permanent camp in 6640 BC. The population of the valley grew cereals, raised domestic livestock, and developed commercial trade with people from Sègre and Occitania. (the present-day Natural Park located in Escaldes-Engordany was declared a UNESCO World Heritage Site)

Other archaeological deposits include the Tombs of Segudet (Ordino) and Feixa del Moro (Sant Julià de Lòria), both dated to 4900–4300 BC as an example of the Urn culture in Andorra. The model of small settlements began to evolve to complex urbanism during the Bronze Age. Metallurgical items of iron, ancient coins, and reliquaries can be found in the ancient sanctuaries scattered around the country.

The sanctuary of Roc de les Bruixes (Stone of the Witches) is perhaps the most important archaeological complex of this age in Andorra, located in the parish of Canillo, about the rituals of funerals, ancient scripture and engraved stone murals.

=== Iberian and Roman Andorra ===
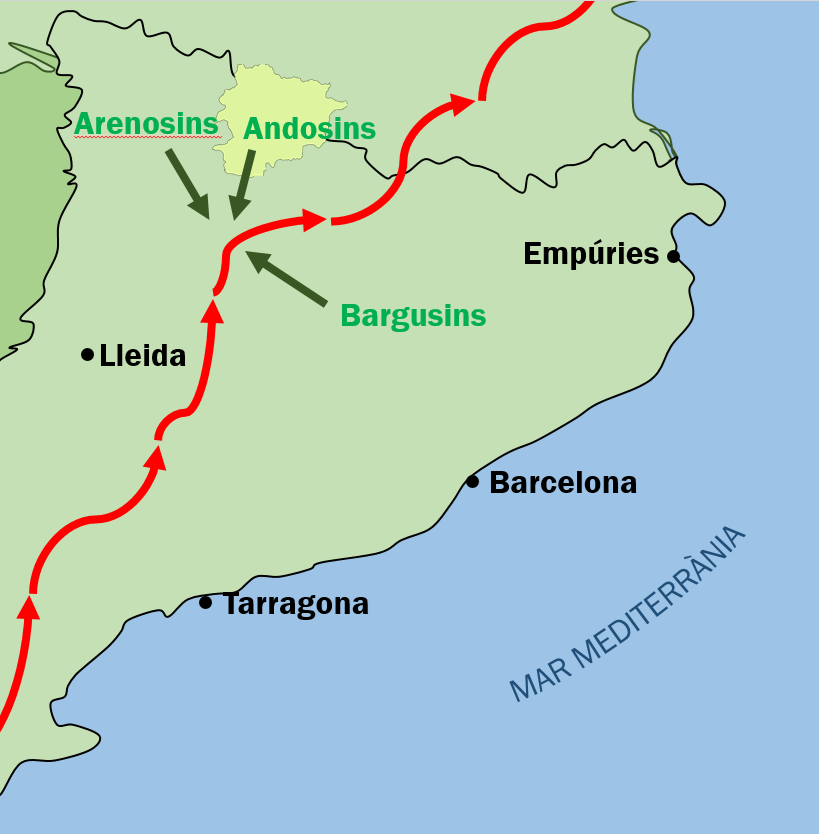
Hannibal's route (red) during the Second Punic War. The Iberian tribes (green) fought against the Carthaginian army in the Pyrenees.

The inhabitants of the valleys were traditionally associated with the Iberians and historically located in Andorra as the Iberian tribe Andosins or Andosini (Ἀνδοσίνους) during the 7th and 2nd centuries BC. Influenced by the Celtic, Aquitanian, Basque and Iberian languages, the locals developed some current toponyms. Early writings and documents relating to this group of people goes back to the second century BC by the Greek writer Polybius in his Histories during the Punic Wars.

Some of the most significant remains of this era are the Castle of the Roc d'Enclar (part of the early Marca Hispanica), l'Anxiu in Les Escaldes and Roc de L'Oral in Encamp.

The presence of Roman influence is recorded from the 2nd century BC to the 5th century AD. The places with the most Roman presence are in Camp Vermell (Red Field) in Sant Julià de Lòria, and in some places in Encamp and in the Roc d'Enclar. People continued trading, mainly wine and cereals, with the Roman cities of Urgellet (the present-day La Seu d'Urgell) and across Segre through the via romana Strata Ceretana (also known as Strata Confluetana).

=== Visigoths and Carolingians ===
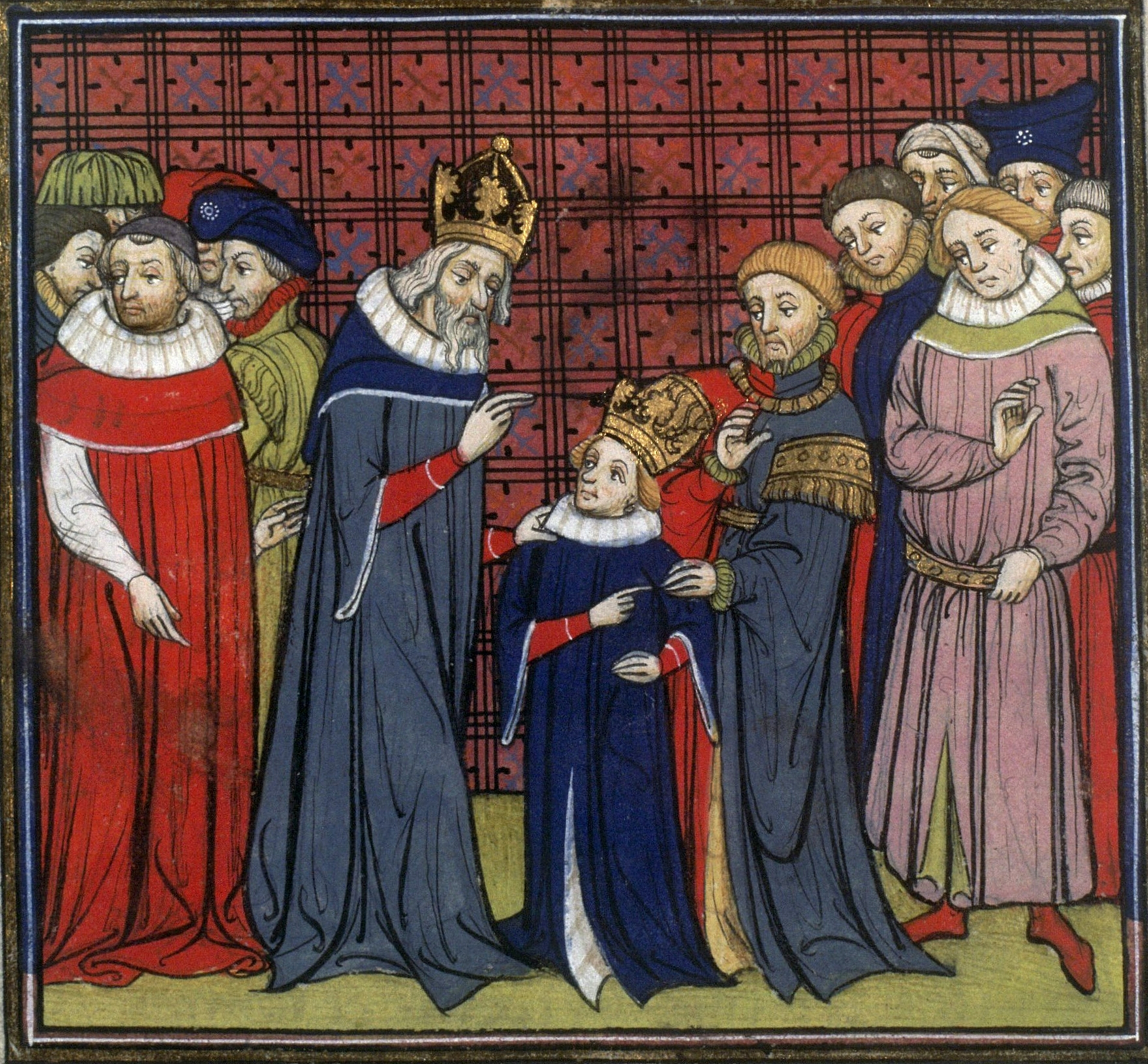
Charlemagne instructing his son, Louis the Pious

After the fall of the Roman Empire, Andorra came under the influence of the Visigoths, the Kingdom of Toledo, and the Diocese of Urgell. The Visigoths remained in the valleys for 200 years, during which time Christianity spread. When the Muslim Empire of Al-Andalus replaced the ruling Visigoths in most of the Iberian Peninsula, Andorra was under the jurisdiction of the Franks.

Tradition holds that Charles the Great (Charlemagne) granted a charter to the Andorran people for a contingent of 5,000 soldiers under the command of Marc Almugaver, in return for fighting against the Moors near Porté-Puymorens (Cerdanya).

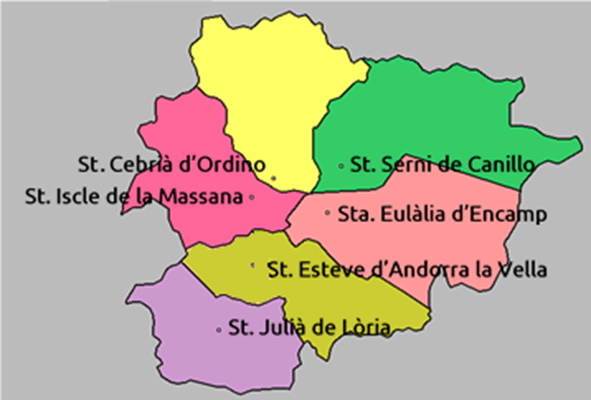
The six old parishes, each named for their patron saint, as depicted in the Acta de Consagració i Dotació de la Catedral de la Seu d'Urgell (839)

Andorra remained part of the Frankish Marca Hispanica, the buffer zone between the Frankish Empire and the Muslim territories, Andorra being part of the territory ruled by the Count of Urgell and eventually the bishop of the Diocese of Urgell. Tradition also holds that it was guaranteed by the son of Charlemagne, Louis the Pious, writing the Carta de Poblament or a local municipal charter c. 805. Sometime between the 7th and 8th Centuries, the oldest church in Andorra was built, the Fortified Church of Sant Vincenç d'Enclar.

The first document that mentions Andorra as a territory is the Acta de Consagració i Dotació de la Catedral de la Seu d'Urgell (Deed of Consecration and Endowment of the Cathedral of La Seu d'Urgell). The document, dated 839, depicts the six old parishes of the Andorran valleys that made up the country's administrative division.

In 988, Count Borrell II of Urgell gave the Andorran valleys to the Diocese of Urgell in exchange for land in Cerdanya. Since then, the bishop of Urgell, based in Seu d'Urgell, has been co-prince of Andorra.

=== Middle Ages: The Paréages and founding of the co-principality ===
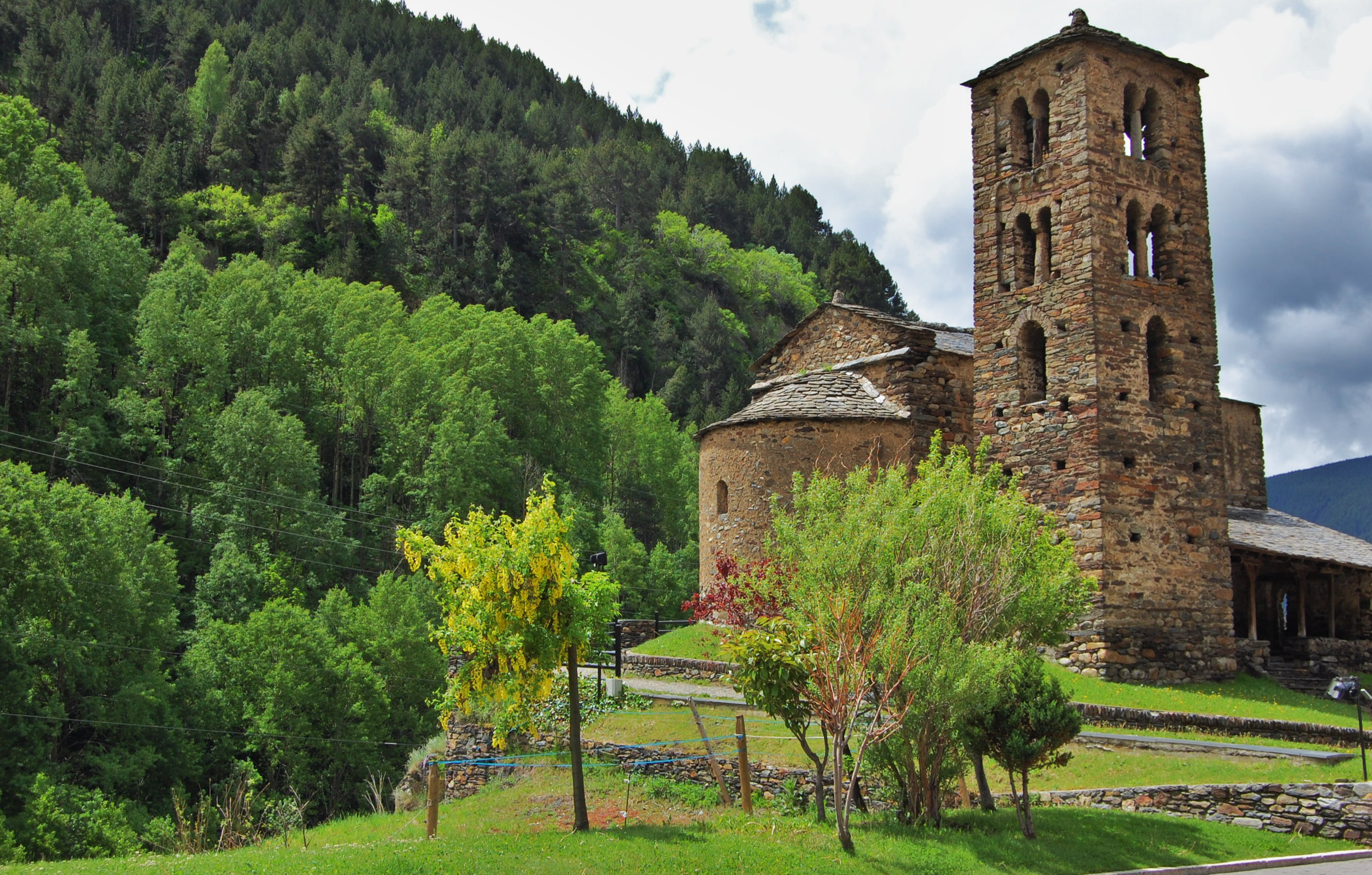
Sant Joan de Caselles church, dating from the 11th century, part of the Andorran Romanesque heritage

Before 1095, Andorra had no military protection, and the bishop of Urgell, who knew that the count of Urgell wanted to reclaim the Andorran valleys, asked the Lord of Caboet for help and protection. In 1095, the lord of Caboet and the bishop of Urgell signed under oath a declaration of their co-sovereignty over Andorra. Arnalda de Caboet, daughter of Arnau of Caboet, married the viscount of Castellbò. Their daughter, Ermessenda de Castellbò, married the count of Foix, Roger-Bernard II. Roger-Bernard II and Ermessenda shared rule over Andorra with the bishop of Urgell.

In the 13th century, a military dispute arose between the bishop of Urgell and the count of Foix as aftermath of the Cathar Crusade. The conflict was resolved in 1278 with the mediation of the king of Aragon, Peter III, between the bishop and the count, by the signing of the first paréage, which provided that Andorra's sovereignty be shared between the count of Foix (whose title would ultimately transfer to the French head of state) and the bishop of Urgell, in the Principality of Catalonia. This gave the principality its territory and political form.

A second paréage was signed in 1288 after a dispute when the count of Foix ordered the construction of a castle in Roc d'Enclar. This was the Fortified Church of Sant Vicenc d'Enclar. The document was ratified by the noble notary Jaume Orig of Puigcerdà, and construction of military structures in the country was prohibited.

In 1364, the political organisation of the country named the figure of the syndic (now spokesman and president of the parliament) as representative of the Andorrans to their co-princes, making possible the creation of local departments (comuns, quarts and veïnats). After being ratified by Bishop Francesc Tovia and Count John I, the Consell de la Terra or Consell General de les Valls (General Council of the Valleys) was founded in 1419, the second oldest parliament in Europe. The syndic Andreu d'Alàs and the General Council organised the creation of the Justice Courts (La Cort de Justicia) in 1433 with the co-princes and the collection of taxes like foc i lloc (literally "fire and site", a national tax active since then).

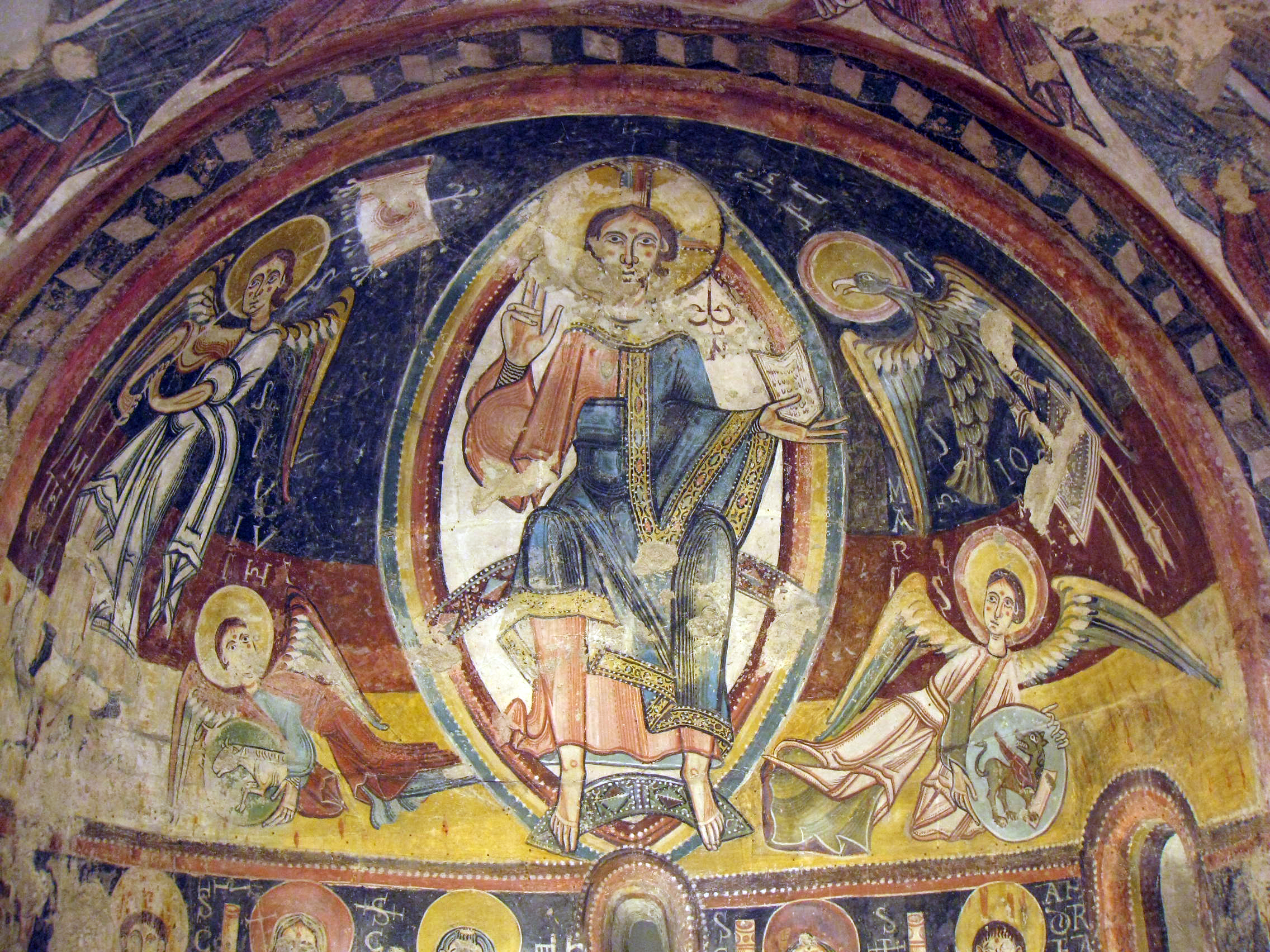
Apse fresco of Sant Miquel d'Engolasters church, painted by Mestre de Santa Coloma during the 12th century

Although there are remains of ecclesiastical works dating before the 9th century (Sant Vicenç d'Enclar or Església de Santa Coloma), Andorra developed exquisite Romanesque Art during the 9th through 14th centuries, particularly in the construction of churches, bridges, religious murals and statues of the Virgin and Child (Our Lady of Meritxell being the most important). Nowadays, the Romanesque buildings that form part of Andorra's cultural heritage stand out in a remarkable way, with an emphasis on Església de Sant Esteve, Sant Joan de Caselles, Església de Sant Miquel d'Engolasters, Sant Martí de la Cortinada and the medieval bridges of Margineda and Escalls among many others.

The Catalan Pyrenees were embryonic of the Catalan language at the end of the 11th century. Andorra was influenced by this language, which was adopted locally decades before it expanded to the rest of the Crown of Aragon.

The local economy during the Middle Ages was based on livestock, agriculture, furs and weavers. Later, at the end of the 11th century, the first iron foundries began to appear in Northern Parishes like Ordino, much appreciated by the master artisans who developed the art of the forges, an important economic activity in the country from the 15th century.

=== 16th to 18th centuries ===
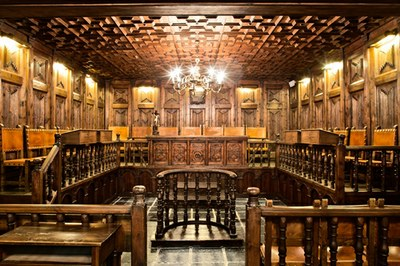
Main hall of Tribunal de Corts (High Court of Justice) inside Casa de la Vall, the central Judiciary Court of Andorra

In 1601 the Tribunal de Corts (High Court of Justice) was created as a result of Huguenot rebellions in France, Inquisition courts coming from Spain and witchcraft-related beliefs native to the area, in the context of the Reformation and Counter-Reformation.

With the passage of time, the co-title to Andorra passed to the kings of Navarre. After Henry III of Navarre became king of France, he issued an edict in 1607 that established the head of the French state and the bishop of Urgell as co-lords of Andorra. From the last quarter of the 17th century onwards, as political ties with the Principality of Catalonia and the Monarchy of Spain progressively weakened, the co-lords began to be referred and act as "co-princes" (sovereigns), a political arrangement that still holds.

During 1617, communal councils form the sometent (popular militia or army) to deal with the rise of bandolerisme (brigandage) and the Consell de la Terra was defined and structured in terms of its composition, organisation and competences current today.

Andorra continued with the same economic system that it had during the 12th–14th centuries with a large production of metallurgy (fargues, a system similar to Farga Catalana) and with the introduction of tobacco circa 1692 and import trade. In 1371 and 1448, the co-princes ratified the fair of Andorra la Vella, the most commercially important annual national festival ever since.

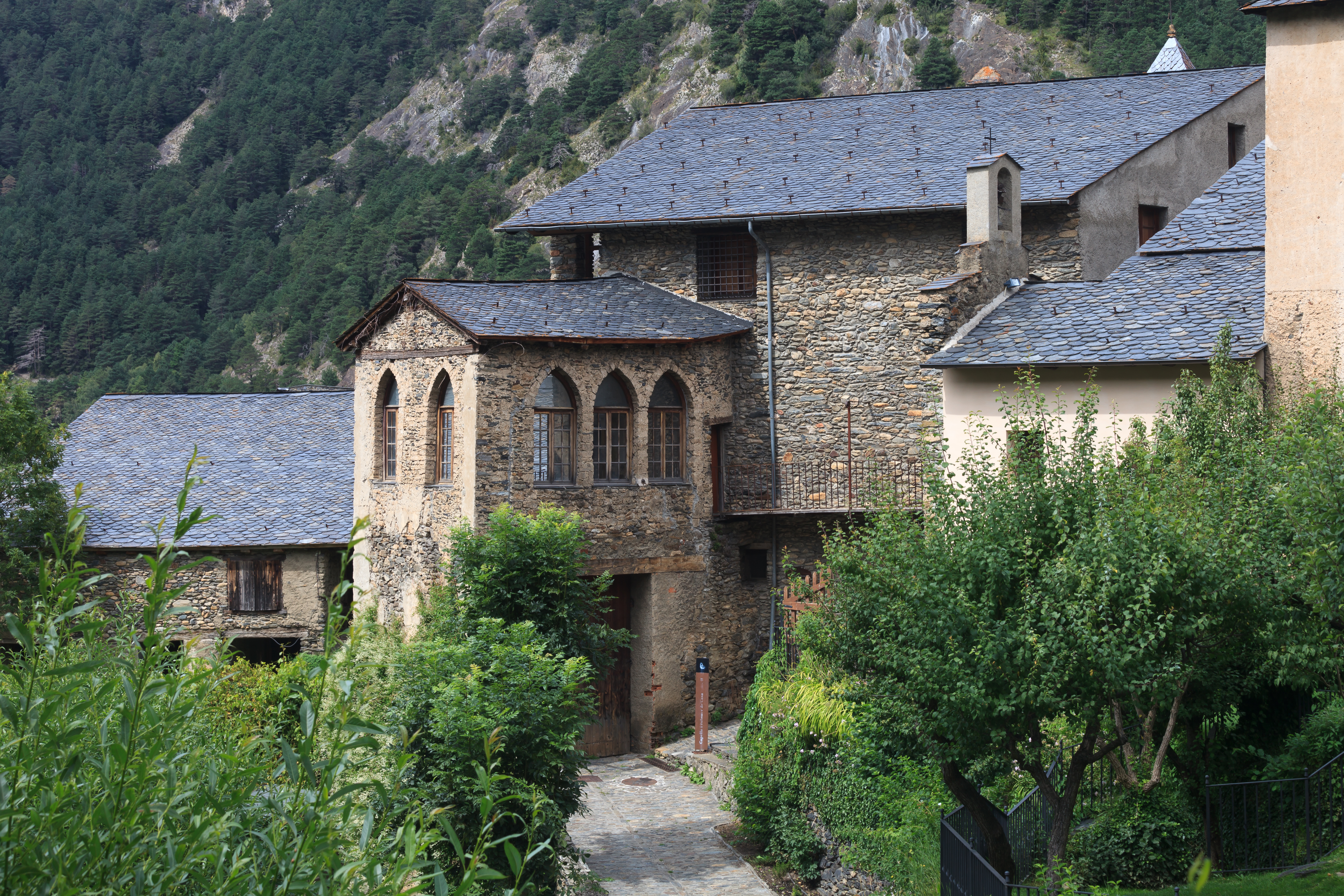
Manor house of the Rossell family in Ordino, Casa Rossell, built in 1611. The family also owned the largest ironwork forges in Andorra as Farga Rossell and Farga del Serrat.

The country had a unique and experienced guild of weavers, Confraria de Paraires i Teixidors, in Escaldes-Engordany. Founded in 1604, it took advantage of the local thermal waters. By this time, the country was characterised by the social system of prohoms (wealthy society) and casalers (rest of the population with smaller economic acquisition), deriving from the tradition of pubilla and hereu.

Three centuries after its foundation, the Consell de la Terra located its headquarters and the Tribunal de Corts in Casa de la Vall in 1702. The manor house built in 1580 served as a noble fortress of the Busquets family. Inside the parliament was placed the Closet of the Six Keys (Armari de les sis claus), representative of each Andorran parish, where the Andorran constitution and other documents and laws were later kept.

In both the Reapers' War and the War of the Spanish Succession, the Andorran people (while professing to be a neutral country) supported the rest of the Catalans who ultimately saw most of their rights suppressed in 1716 as a consequence of the promulgation of the Nueva Planta decrees. In order to avoid the application of Nueva Planta to Andorra, the Bishop of Urgell, Simeón de Guinda, convinced the new Spanish Bourbon authorities that the Valleys of Andorra had always been neutral and unrelated to the Principality of Catalonia, resulting in the definitive political separation of Andorra from Catalonia. Another direct reaction to the events was the promotion of Catalan writings in Andorra, with cultural works such as the Book of Privileges (Llibre de Privilegis de 1674), Manual Digest (1748) by Antoni Fiter i Rossell or the Polità andorrà (1763) by Antoni Puig.

=== 19th century: New Reform and the Andorran Question ===
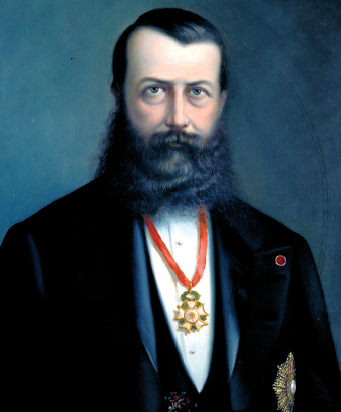
Guillem d'Areny-Plandolit led the New Reform of 1866.

After the French Revolution, Napoleon I reestablished the Co-Principate in 1809 and removed the French medieval title. In 1812–1813, the First French Empire attempted to annex Catalonia during the Peninsular War (Guerra Peninsular) and divided the region into four departements, with Andorra as a part of the district of Puigcerdà. After the French defeat in the Peninsular War in 1814, an imperial decree reestablished the independence and economy of Andorra.

During this period, Andorra's late medieval institutions and rural culture remained largely unchanged. In 1866, the syndic Guillem d'Areny-Plandolit led the reformist group in a Council General of 24 members elected by suffrage limited to heads of families. The Council General replaced the aristocratic oligarchy that previously ruled the state.

The New Reform (Nova Reforma) began after ratification by both Co-Princes and established the basis of the constitution and symbols – such as the tricolour flag – of Andorra. A new service economy arose as a demand of the valley inhabitants and began to build infrastructure such as hotels, spa resorts, roads and telegraph lines.

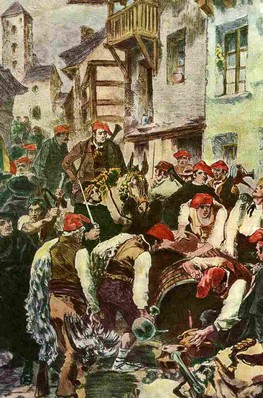
Canillo scenery during the Revolution of 1881

The authorities of the Co-Princes banned casinos and betting houses throughout the country. The ban resulted in an economic conflict and the Revolution of 1881, which began when revolutionaries assaulted the house of the syndic on 8 December 1880, and established the Provisional Revolutionary Council led by Joan Pla i Calvo and Pere Baró i Mas. The Provisional Revolutionary Council allowed for the construction of casinos and spas by foreign companies. From 7 to 9 June 1881, the loyalists of Canillo and Encamp reconquered the parishes of Ordino and La Massana by establishing contact with the revolutionary forces in Escaldes-Engordany. After a day of combat the Treaty of the Bridge of Escalls was signed on 10 June. The council was replaced and new elections were held. The economic situation worsened, as the populace was divided over the Qüestió d'Andorra – the "Andorran Question". The struggles continued between pro-bishops, pro-French, and nationalists based on the troubles of Canillo in 1882 and 1885.

Andorra participated in the cultural movement of the Catalan Renaixença. Between 1882 and 1887, the first academic schools were formed where trilingualism coexisted with the official language, Catalan. Romantic authors from France and Spain reported the awakening of the national consciousness of the country. Jacint Verdaguer lived in Ordino during the 1880s where he wrote and shared works related to the Renaixença with writer and photographer Joaquim de Riba.

In 1848, Fromental Halévy had premiered the opera Le val d'Andorre to great success in Europe, where the national consciousness of the valleys was exposed in the romantic work during the Peninsular War.

=== 20th and 21st century: Modernisation of the country and constitution ===
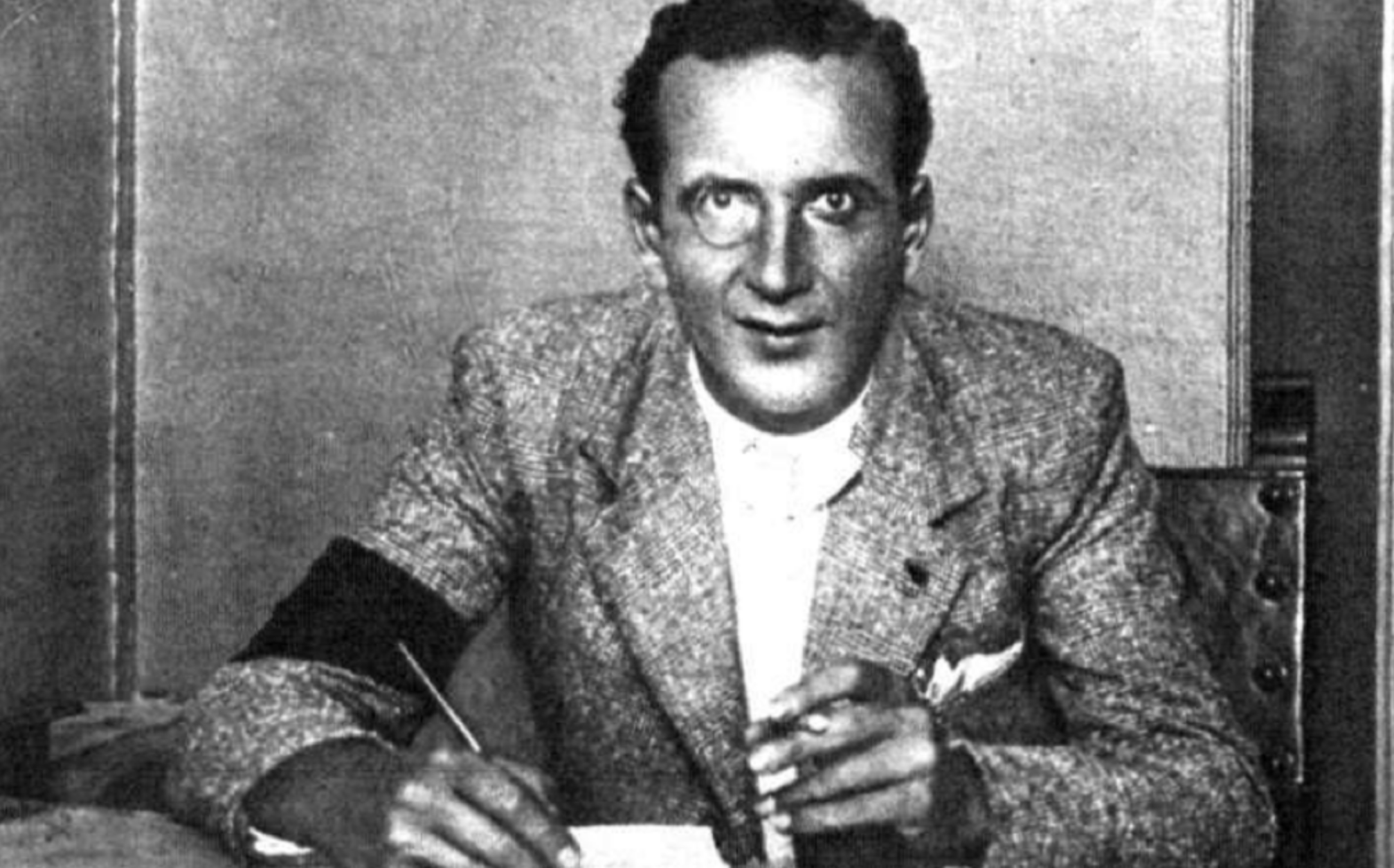
Boris Skossyreff, briefly self-proclaimed King of Andorra in 1934

In 1933 France occupied Andorra following social unrest which occurred before elections due to the Revolution of 1933 and the FHASA strikes (Vagues de FHASA); the revolt led by Joves Andorrans (a labour union group related to the Spanish CNT and FAI) called for political reforms, the universal suffrage vote of all Andorrans and acted in defence of the rights of local and foreign workers during the construction of FHASA's hydroelectric power station in Encamp. On 5 April 1933 Joves Andorrans seized the Andorran Parliament. These actions were preceded by the arrival of Colonel René-Jules Baulard with 50 gendarmes and the mobilisation of 200 local militias or sometent led by the Síndic Francesc Cairat.

On 6 July 1934, adventurer and nobleman Boris Skossyreff, with his promise of freedoms and modernisation of the country and wealth through the establishment of a tax haven and foreign investments, received the support of the members of the General Council to proclaim himself the sovereign of Andorra. On 8 July 1934 Boris issued a proclamation in Urgell, declaring himself Boris I, King of Andorra, simultaneously declaring war on the Bishop of Urgell and approving the King's constitution on 10 July. He was arrested by the Co-Prince and Bishop Justí Guitart i Vilardebó and their authorities on 20 July and ultimately expelled from Spain. From 1936 until 1940, a French military detachment of Garde Mobile led by well-known Colonel René-Jules Baulard was garrisoned in Andorra to secure the principality against disruption from the Spanish Civil War and Francoist Spain and also face the rise of Republicanism in the aftermath of the 1933 Revolution. During the Spanish Civil War, the inhabitants of Andorra welcomed refugees from both sides, and many of them settled permanently in the country thus contributing to the subsequent economic boom and the entry into the capitalist era of Andorra. Francoist troops reached the Andorran border in the later stages of the war.

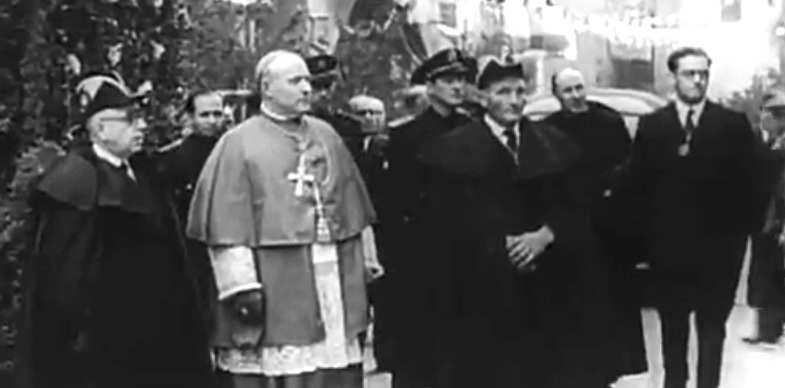
Enthronement as Co-Prince in 1942 of Bishop Ramón Iglesias (centre). The local comite was led by Francesc Cairat (left), the First General Syndic with the longest regencie, from 1936 to 1960.

During World War II, Andorra remained neutral and was an important smuggling route between Vichy France and Francoist Spain. Many Andorrans criticised the passivity of the General Council for impeding both the entry and expulsion of foreigners and refugees, committing economic crimes, reducing the rights of citizens and sympathy with Francoism. General Council members justified the council's political and diplomatic actions as necessary for Andorra's survival and the protection of its sovereignty. Andorra was relatively unscathed by the two world wars and the Spanish Civil War. Certain groups formed to help victims of oppression in Nazi-occupied countries, while participating in smuggling to help Andorra survive. Among the most prominent was the Hostal Palanques Evasion Network Command, which, in contact with the British MI6, helped almost 400 fugitives, among whom were Allied military personnel. The Command remained active between 1941 and 1944, although there were struggles with pro-Axis informers and Gestapo agents in Andorra.

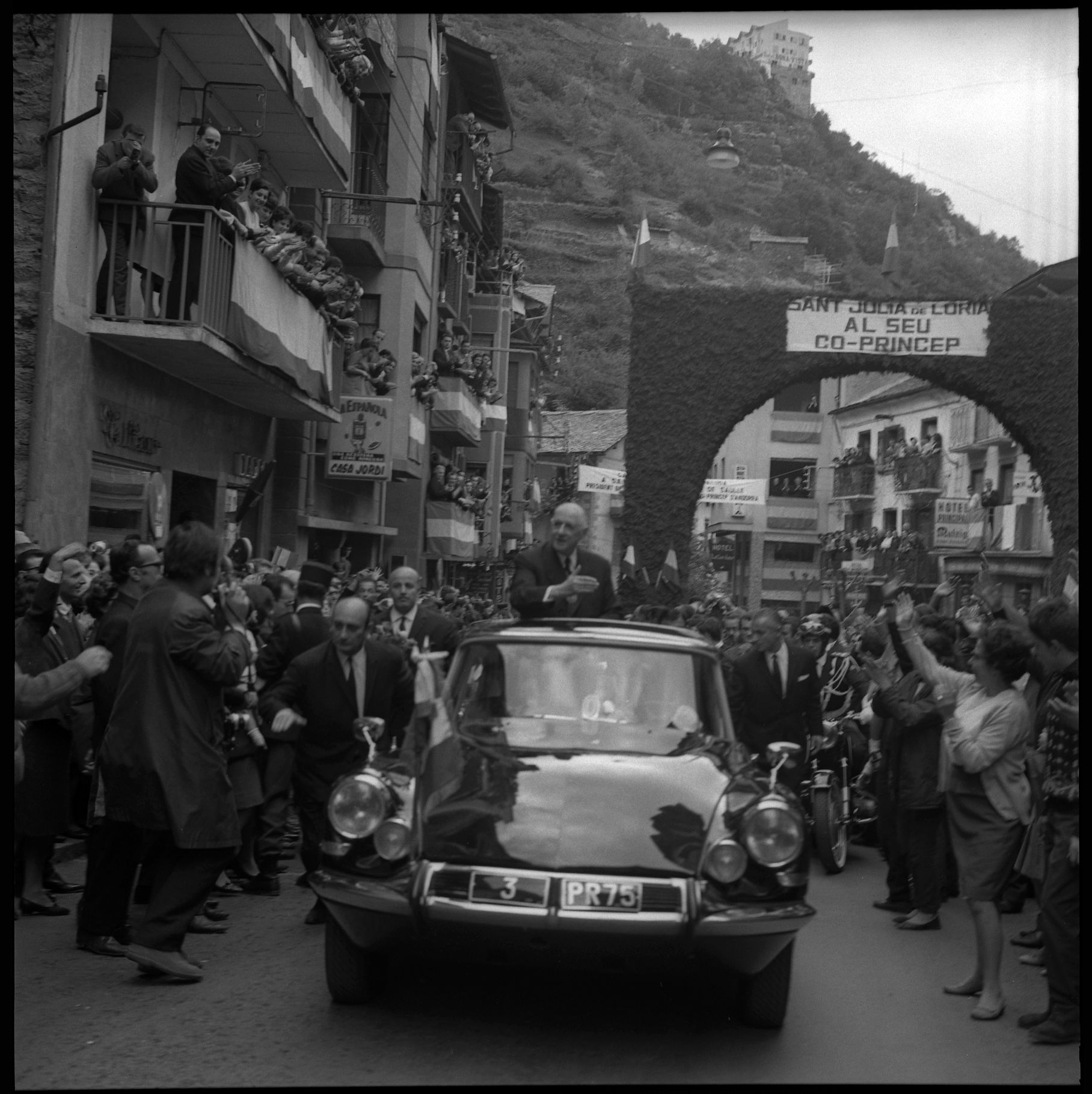
Co-Prince Charles de Gaulle in the streets of Sant Julià de Lòria in Andorra, October 1967

In the capital city there was a smuggling black market of propaganda, culture and cinematic art not favourable to totalitarian regimes, promulgated in such places as the Hotel Mirador or the Casino Hotel, as a meeting place for Free French forces and a route for escorting downed Allied pilots out of Europe. The network was maintained after the war, when film societies were formed, where movies, music and books censored in Franco's Spain were imported, becoming an anti-censorship attraction for the Catalan or foreign public even within Andorra. The Andorran Group (Agrupament Andorrà), an anti-fascist organisation linked to the Occitanie's French Resistance, accused the French representative (veguer) of collaboration with Nazism.

The Andorran opening to the capitalist economy resulted in two axes: mass tourism and the country's tax exemption. The first steps towards the capitalist boom date from the 1930s, with the construction of FHASA and the creation of professional banking with Banc Agrícol (1930) and Crèdit Andorrà (1949), later with Banca Mora (1952), Banca Cassany (1957) and SOBANCA (1960). Shortly after, activities such as skiing and shopping helped the country become a tourist attraction, with the inauguration of ski resorts and cultural entities in the late 1930s. A revived hotel industry also developed. In April 1968 a social health insurance system was created (CASS).

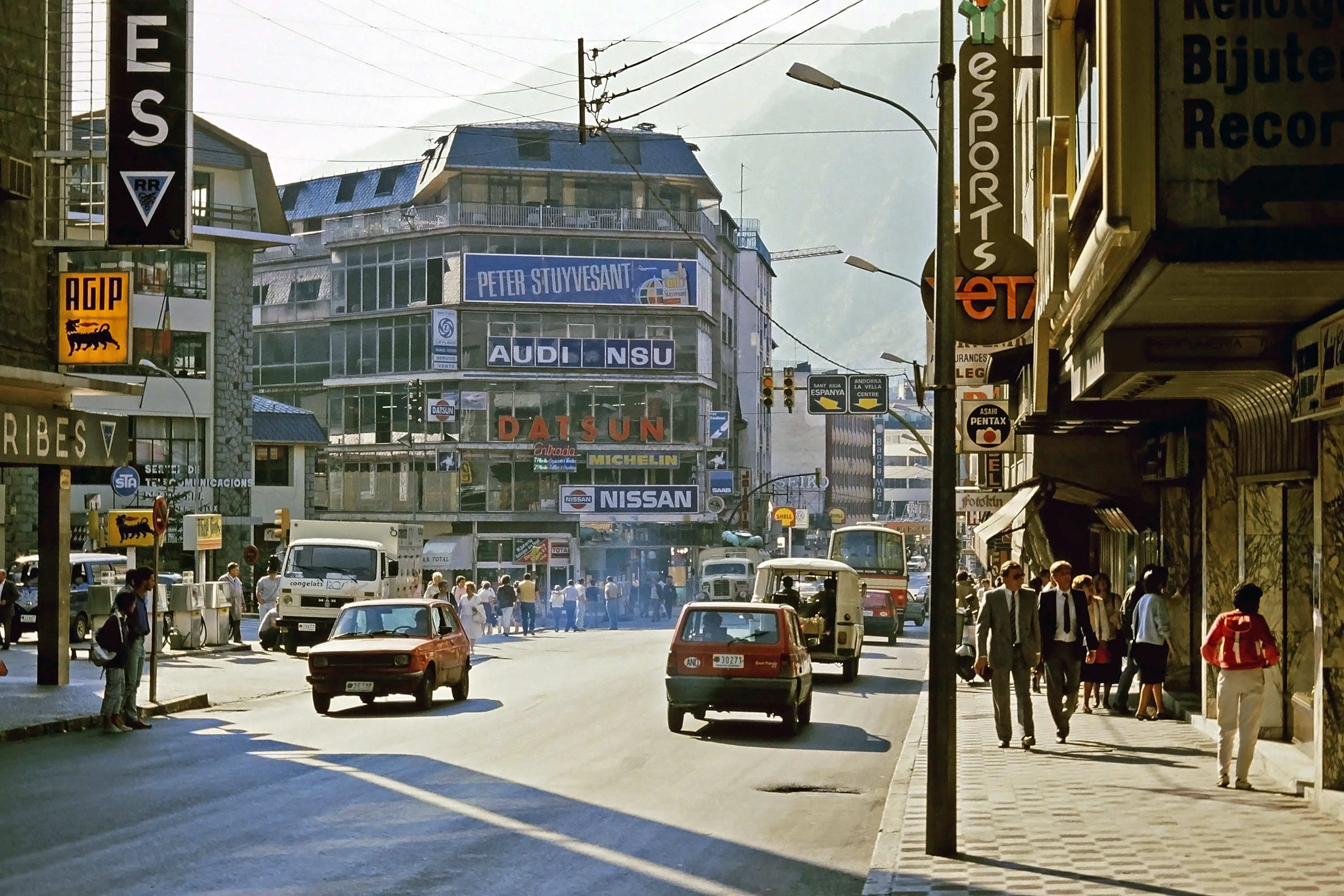
Streets of the city centre of Andorra la Vella in 1986. From 1986 until 1989 Andorra normalised the economic treaties with the EEC.

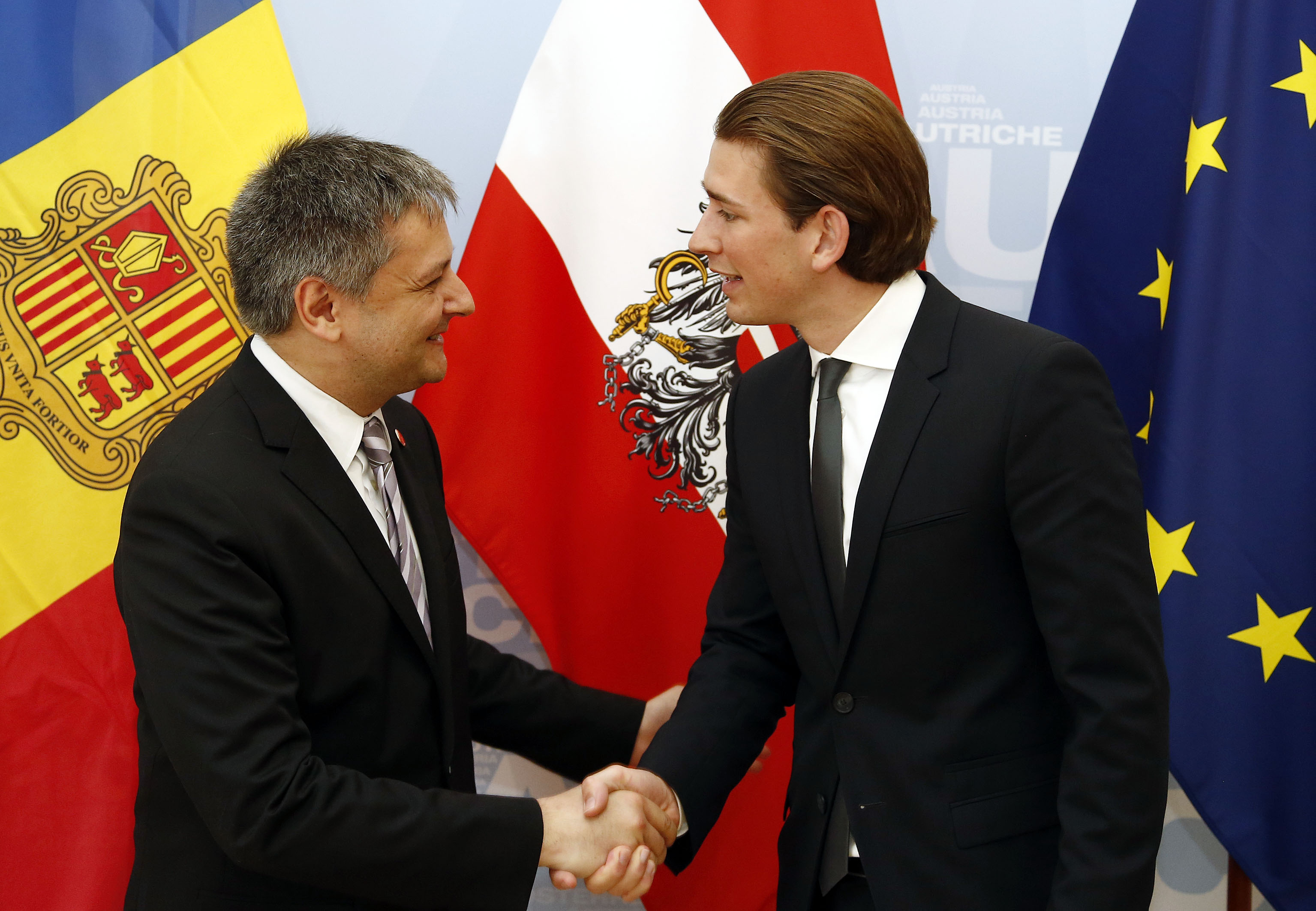
Foreign Minister of Andorra Gilbert Saboya (on left) meeting Austrian foreign minister Sebastian Kurz at the Committee of Ministers of the Council of Europe in 2014

The Andorran government necessarily involved planning, projection and forecasts for the future: with the official visit of the French co-prince Charles de Gaulle in 1967 and 1969; it was given approval for the economic boom and national demands within the framework of human rights and international openness.

Andorra experienced an era commonly known as the "Andorran dream" (similar to the American Dream) along with the Trente Glorieuses: mass culture rooted itself in the country experiencing radical changes in the economy and culture. Proof of this was Ràdio Andorra, the top musical radio station in Europe in this period, with guests and speakers of great importance promoting musical hits from chanson française, swing, rhythm & blues, jazz, rock and roll and American country music. During this period Andorra achieved a GDP per capita and a life expectancy higher than most standard countries of the time.

Given its relative isolation, Andorra has existed outside the mainstream of European history, with few ties to countries other than France, Spain and Portugal. But in recent times its thriving tourist industry, along with developments in transport and communications, have removed the country from its isolation. Since 1976 the country has seen the need to reform Andorran institutions due to anachronisms in sovereignty, human rights and the balance of powers as well as the need to adapt legislation to modern demands. In 1982 a first separation of powers took place when instituting the Govern d'Andorra, under the name of the executive board (Consell Executiu), chaired by the first prime minister Òscar Ribas Reig with the co-princes' approval. In 1989 the Principality signed an agreement with the European Economic Community to regularise trade relations.

Its political system was modernised in 1993 after the Andorran constitutional referendum, when the constitution was drafted by the co-princes and the General Council and approved on 14 March by 74.2% of voters, with a 76% turnout. The first elections under the new constitution were held later in the year. The same year, Andorra became a member of the United Nations and the Council of Europe.

Andorra formalised diplomatic relations with the United States in 1996, participating in the 51st UN General Assembly. First General Syndic Marc Forné took part in a speech in Catalan in the General Assembly to defend the reform of the organisation, and after three days he took part in the Parliamentary Assembly of the Council of Europe to defend Andorra's linguistic rights and economy. In 2004, the Madriu-Perafita-Claror Valley was enlisted as a UNESCO World Heritage Site, making it Andorra's first site, for its ancient pastoralism, communal land-use and ironworking traditions. In 2006 a monetary agreement with the European Union was formalised that allows Andorra to use the euro officially, as well as minting its own euro coins.

== Geography ==
Topographic map of Andorra.

Andorra is a small landlocked country in the eastern Pyrenees mountain range, between France and Spain. It covers 468 km^{2} (181 sq mi), has an average elevation of 1,996 m (6,549 ft), and shares borders of 56.6 km (35.2 mi) with France and 63.7 km (39.6 mi) with Spain. Its terrain is predominantly mountainous; its highest point is Coma Pedrosa, at 2,942 m (9,652 ft), and its lowest is at the Riu Runer confluence, at 840 m (2,756 ft). The rivers Valira del Nord in the west and Valira d'Orient in the east flow through the country's two principal valleys and converge in Escaldes-Engordany to form the Gran Valira, Andorra's principal river. The population is concentrated mainly along the valley floors. At an elevation of 1,023 m (3,356 ft), Andorra la Vella is the highest capital city in Europe.

=== Climate ===
Andorra has a high-mountain Mediterranean climate influenced by Mediterranean and Atlantic atmospheric circulation patterns. Summers are generally mild and winters are long and cold, while differences in altitude, relief and valley orientation create numerous microclimates. Temperatures decrease with elevation, and mean annual temperatures are estimated to fall below 0 °C (32 °F) above about 2,600 m (8,530 ft); the proportion of precipitation falling as snow increases with altitude. The Pas de la Casa area, on the Atlantic side of the drainage divide, is particularly exposed to moist northerly air, whereas the Valira valleys on the Mediterranean side are generally more sheltered and sunnier. Precipitation is generally most abundant during spring and summer and may remain high into autumn; winters are drier, except in northern and high-altitude areas exposed to Atlantic fronts, where snowfall is heavier.

Climate data for Andorra la Vella (Roc de Sant Pere), elevation 1,113 m (3,652 ft) (1991–2010 averages; extremes 1991–2019)
Month	Jan	Feb	Mar	Apr	May	Jun	Jul	Aug	Sep	Oct	Nov	Dec	Year
Record high °C (°F)	21.3 (70.3)	22.4 (72.3)	25.2 (77.4)	29.0 (84.2)	31.4 (88.5)	34.3 (93.7)	36.0 (96.8)	37.9 (100.2)	33.0 (91.4)	31.0 (87.8)	23.1 (73.6)	18.7 (65.7)	37.9 (100.2)
Mean daily maximum °C (°F)	8.9 (48.0)	10.9 (51.6)	13.9 (57.0)	15.1 (59.2)	19.5 (67.1)	24.2 (75.6)	27.5 (81.5)	27.1 (80.8)	22.3 (72.1)	17.7 (63.9)	12.2 (54.0)	8.9 (48.0)	17.4 (63.3)
Daily mean °C (°F)	4.2 (39.6)	5.5 (41.9)	8.0 (46.4)	9.5 (49.1)	13.5 (56.3)	17.6 (63.7)	20.3 (68.5)	20.0 (68.0)	16.0 (60.8)	12.3 (54.1)	7.3 (45.1)	4.6 (40.3)	11.6 (52.9)
Mean daily minimum °C (°F)	−0.5 (31.1)	0.0 (32.0)	2.0 (35.6)	3.9 (39.0)	7.6 (45.7)	11.0 (51.8)	13.2 (55.8)	13.0 (55.4)	9.6 (49.3)	6.9 (44.4)	2.4 (36.3)	0.3 (32.5)	5.8 (42.4)
Record low °C (°F)	−11.4 (11.5)	−11.4 (11.5)	−10.6 (12.9)	−5.0 (23.0)	−0.7 (30.7)	2.8 (37.0)	4.5 (40.1)	5.4 (41.7)	0.9 (33.6)	−2.1 (28.2)	−8.2 (17.2)	−8.9 (16.0)	−11.4 (11.5)
Average precipitation mm (inches)	49.8 (1.96)	26.8 (1.06)	39.2 (1.54)	65.9 (2.59)	90.7 (3.57)	82.3 (3.24)	59.4 (2.34)	73.6 (2.90)	76.2 (3.00)	78.0 (3.07)	66.1 (2.60)	48.7 (1.92)	756.7 (29.79)
Average precipitation days (≥ 1 mm)	6.5	4.7	6.0	9.1	10.4	8.6	7.0	7.3	7.0	7.2	6.3	5.8	85.9
Mean monthly sunshine hours	122.4	155.7	186.7	170.9	189.0	222.0	254.2	230.0	190.7	157.0	131.1	99.0	2,108.6
Source 1: Météo-France (sunshine 1992–2010)
Source 2: Servei Meteorològic Nacional (station elevation)

Long-term records show significant warming: between 1950 and 2015, Andorra's annual mean temperature increased by 0.18 °C (0.32 °F) per decade, with the strongest seasonal increase occurring in summer, at 0.29 °C (0.52 °F) per decade. Further warming is expected to reduce snowfall and shorten the ski season, posing risks to Andorra's winter tourism sector. Greater reliance on artificial snowmaking may also increase pressure on water resources.

=== Biodiversity ===
The 2012 national land-cover map classified about 40% of the country as dense woodland, 25% as meadows and grassland, 13% as scree and 9% as shrubland. Andorra's vegetation is distributed in altitudinal zones: downy oak and Scots pine occur in the montane belt, mountain pine and silver fir in the subalpine belt, and alpine grasslands at the highest elevations.

The parish of Ordino was designated a UNESCO biosphere reserve in 2020. The 8,473 ha (20,940 acres) reserve contains forests of Scots pine, silver fir, sessile oak and mountain pine, as well as alpine meadows, and supports species including Aurelio's rock lizard (Iberolacerta aurelioi) and the Pyrenean desman. The natural parks of the Sorteny Valley and Comapedrosa Valleys, together with the Madriu-Perafita-Claror Valley, form Andorra's established network of protected natural areas. All three are designated Ramsar sites, covering 6,870 ha (17,000 acres) in total.

== Government and politics ==
=== Government ===
Co-princes
Joint head of state

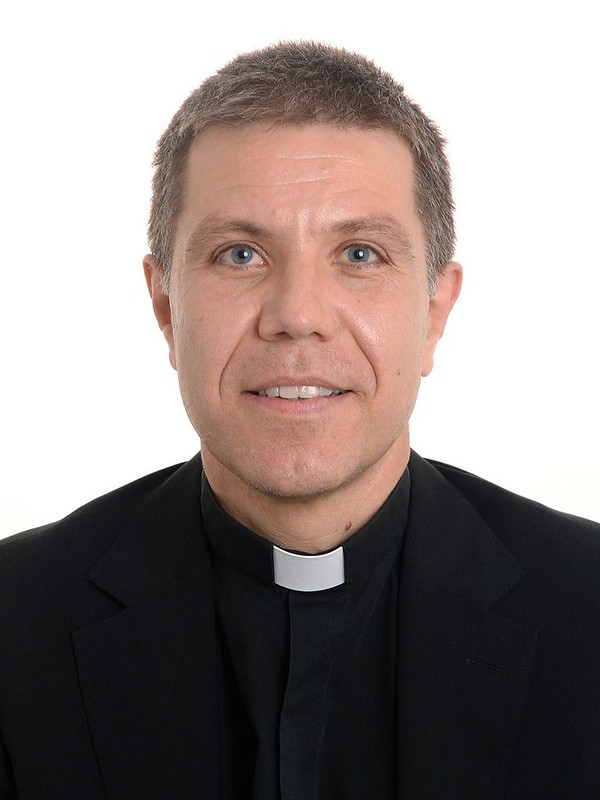
Josep-Lluís Serrano Pentinat
Episcopal co-prince
since 2025

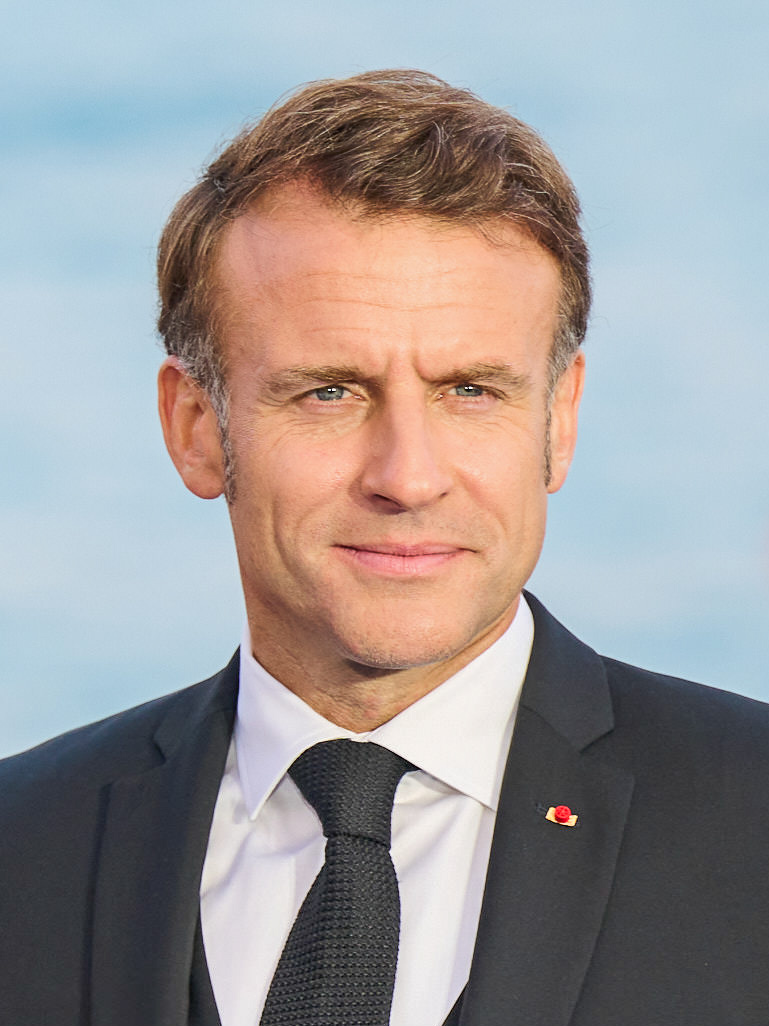
Emmanuel Macron
French co-prince
since 2017

Head of government
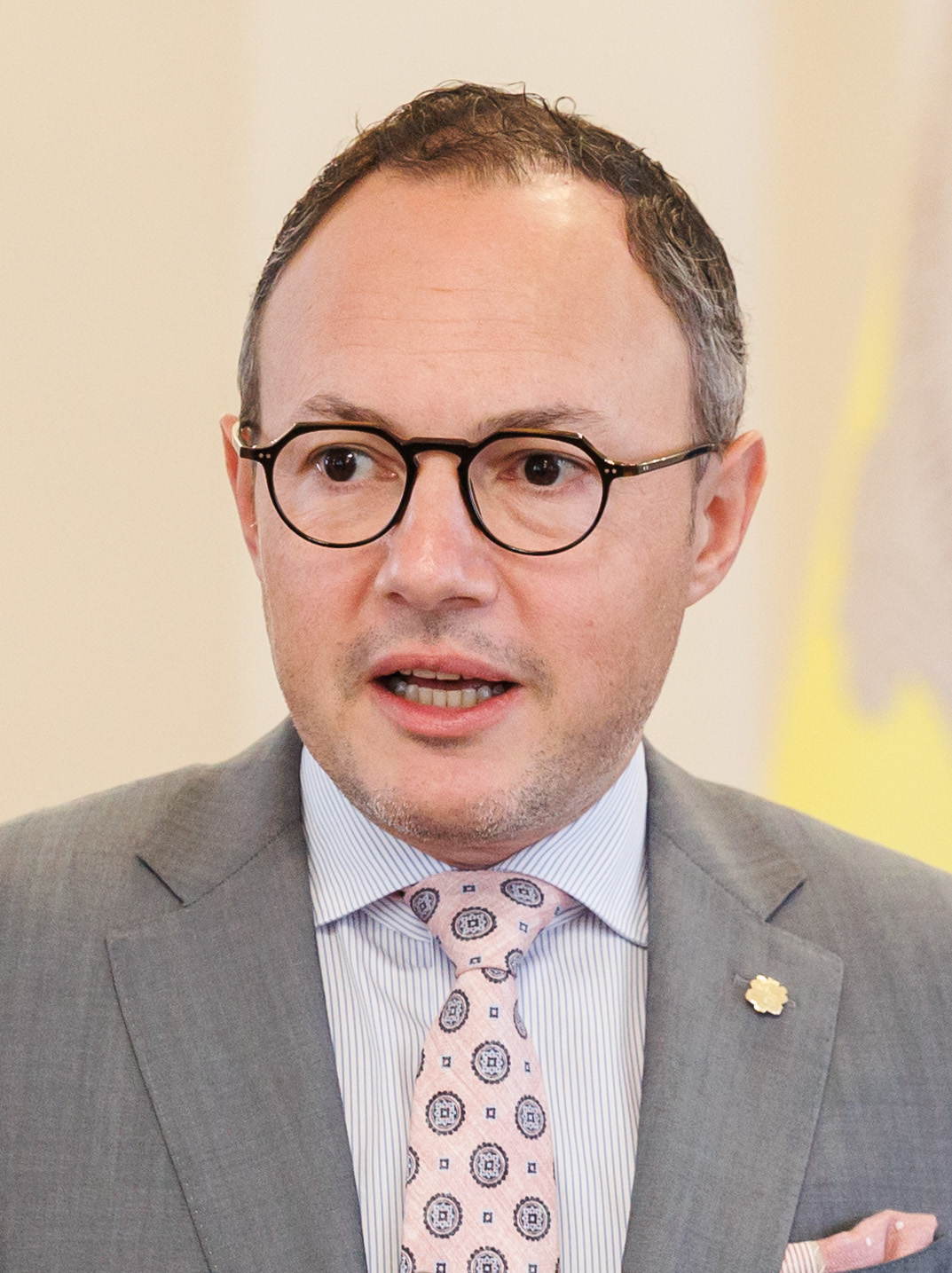
Xavier Espot Zamora
since 2019

Under the 1993 Constitution, Andorra is a parliamentary co-principality in which sovereignty is vested in the Andorran people. The Bishop of Urgell and the president of France serve as the co-princes, who jointly and indivisibly constitute the head of state and have equal constitutional powers. They represent the state and arbitrate and moderate the functioning of its public authorities. Except where the Constitution provides otherwise, their acts require the countersignature of the head of government or the syndic general, and political responsibility rests with the countersigning official.

Andorra is a unitary state and a constitutional diarchy. Its political system is also described as a parliamentary monarchy. The French co-prince holds the office by virtue of being the elected president of France, whereas Andorran voters do not participate in selecting either co-prince.

The Government consists of the head of government and the ministers. Under the direction of the head of government, it conducts Andorra's national and international policy, directs the state administration and exercises regulatory powers. The head of government is elected by the General Council and appointed by the co-princes, while the Government as a whole is politically accountable to the Council. Xavier Espot Zamora of Democrats for Andorra has served as head of government since 16 May 2019.

The General Council is Andorra's unicameral legislature. It has 28 councillors elected for four-year terms: 14 from a single nationwide constituency and two from each of the seven parish constituencies. The Council represents the Andorran people, exercises legislative power, approves the state budget and oversees the Government.

=== Administrative divisions ===
Andorra is divided into seven parishes (parròquies), which constitute its territorial and administrative divisions. The parishes are listed in their traditional protocol order:

Parishes of Andorra
Map	Protocol order	Emblem	Parish	Area (km²)	Population (2025)
Map showing the seven parishes of Andorra	1	Emblem of Canillo	Canillo	106.305	6,457
Map showing the seven parishes of Andorra	2	Emblem of Encamp	Encamp	84.695	13,520
Map showing the seven parishes of Andorra	3	Emblem of Ordino	Ordino	85	5,679
Map showing the seven parishes of Andorra	4	Emblem of La Massana	La Massana	65	12,148
Map showing the seven parishes of Andorra	5	Emblem of Andorra la Vella	Andorra la Vella	31.75	24,836
Map showing the seven parishes of Andorra	6	Emblem of Sant Julià de Lòria	Sant Julià de Lòria	63.5	10,256
Map showing the seven parishes of Andorra	7	Emblem of Escaldes-Engordany	Escaldes–Engordany	31.75	16,162
Total				468	89,058

Each parish is represented and administered by a democratically elected local council, known as a comú. The Constitution grants these councils legal status, local regulatory powers, and administrative and financial autonomy. Some parishes are further divided into quarts and veïnats, whose powers and relationship with the local councils are determined by law according to local custom. Escaldes-Engordany, created in 1978, is the newest parish.

=== Law ===
The Constitution is the highest law in Andorra's legal system and binds public institutions and individuals. It provides for a unified judicial system in which justice is administered by independent judges subject only to the Constitution and the law. The ordinary judiciary comprises the Batllia, the Tribunal de Corts and the Tribunal Superior de Justícia. The Batllia acts at first instance in civil, administrative and criminal matters and conducts criminal investigations; the Tribunal de Corts hears criminal cases at first instance and certain appeals arising from criminal investigations; and the Tribunal Superior de Justícia is the highest ordinary court and hears appeals in civil, administrative and criminal matters.

Judicial administration is entrusted to the five-member Consell Superior de la Justícia (High Council of Justice) (Note: The Catalan text of the Constitution distinguishes the Consell Superior de la Justícia from the Tribunal Superior de Justícia. The English translation published by the General Council renders both names as “High Court of Justice”. “High Council of Justice” is used here to preserve that distinction and is also the form used by the Parliamentary Assembly of the Council of Europe.), which represents and governs the judicial system, safeguards its independence, appoints judges and exercises disciplinary authority over them. Separate from the ordinary judiciary, the Constitutional Court is the supreme interpreter of the Constitution, and its decisions bind public authorities and individuals. It rules on constitutional challenges to legislation, gives preliminary opinions on the constitutionality of international treaties, hears appeals concerning violations of fundamental rights, and resolves jurisdictional conflicts between constitutional institutions.

=== Foreign relations ===
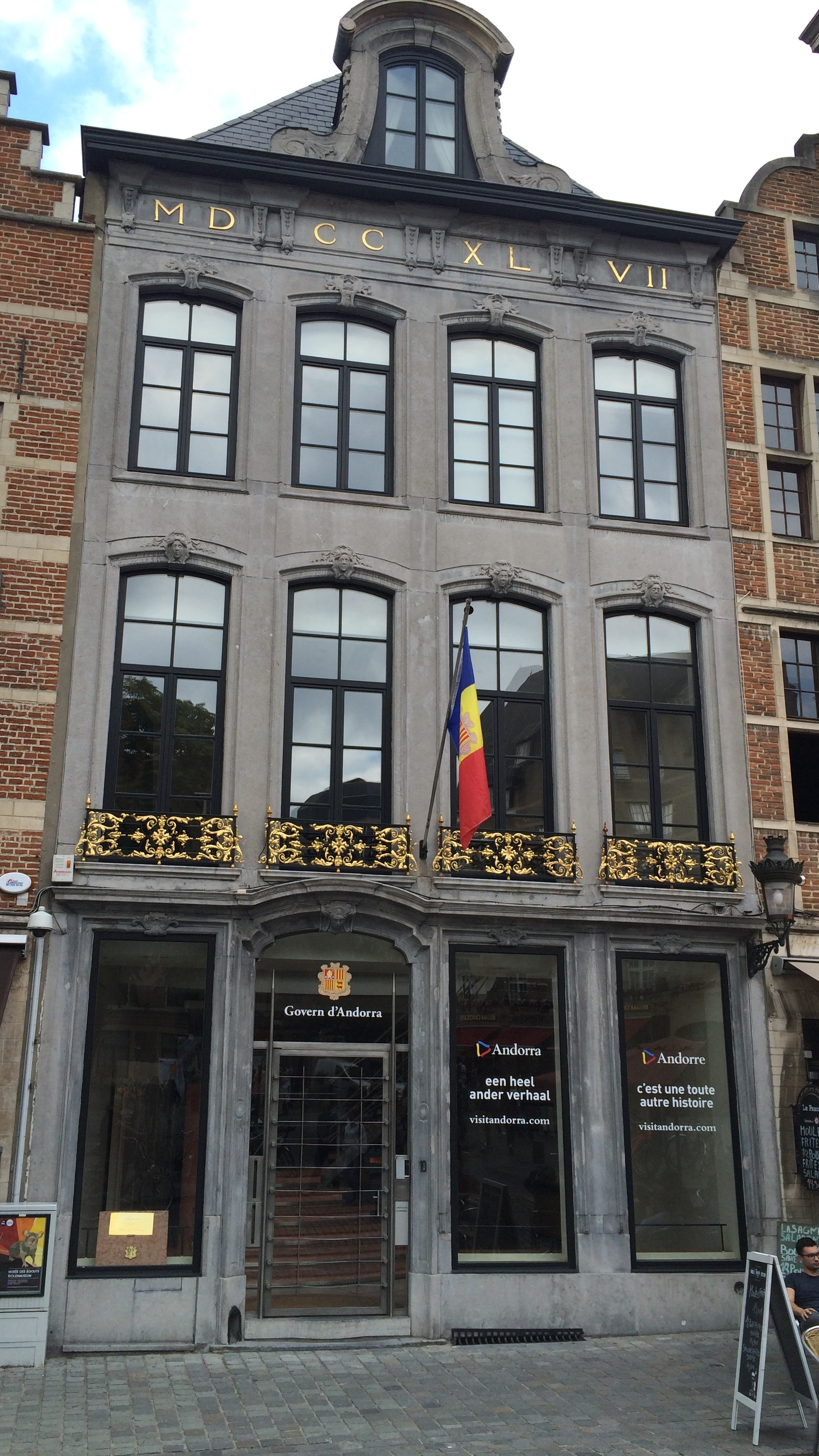
The embassy of Andorra in Brussels.

Following the adoption of the 1993 constitution, Andorra, France and Spain concluded the Treaty of Good Neighbourliness, Friendship and Cooperation, under which France and Spain each established diplomatic relations with Andorra. Andorra was admitted to the United Nations in 1993, joined the Council of Europe in 1994, and became a participating State of the Organization for Security and Co-operation in Europe in 1996. Multilateral participation has been a central objective of Andorran foreign policy; the country also joined the Organisation internationale de la Francophonie and the Ibero-American Conference, reflecting its traditional effort to balance relations with France and Spain and their wider cultural communities. It became the 190th member of the International Monetary Fund in 2020 and has observer status at the World Trade Organization. Its accession working party was established in 1997.

Although Andorra is not a member of the European Union, a customs union has been in force since 1991 and covers industrial products. Under a monetary agreement signed in 2011 and in force since 2012, the euro is Andorra's official currency and the country may issue its own euro coins. The EU association agreement with Andorra and San Marino would allow Andorra to participate in the EU internal market under common rules and equal conditions of competition, including progressive access for financial services, and would establish cooperation in fields such as research, education, social policy and the environment. In July 2026, the Council authorised the agreement's signature and provisional application. As a mixed agreement, it requires the consent of the European Parliament and ratification by Andorra, San Marino and all 27 EU member states before entering fully into force. The Andorran government plans to hold a consultative referendum after the European Parliament gives its consent and, if voters support the agreement, submit it to the General Council, where ratification requires a two-thirds majority.

Andorra maintains extensive institutional and cross-border ties with Catalonia, with which it shares the Catalan language and close cultural, economic and personal links. In June 2026, the two governments adopted a new Work Plan for 2026–2030, which structures cooperation in cross-border challenges, health, infrastructure, the environment, public security, language, culture, and social affairs. One example of this cross-border cooperation is Andorra–La Seu d'Urgell Airport, located in Catalonia and owned by the Government of Catalonia. Andorra has no airport within its territory, and this is the closest airport serving the country. Under a cooperation agreement first concluded in 2014, the Andorran and Catalan governments coordinate the airport's management, operation and promotion through a joint commission.

=== Security and defence ===
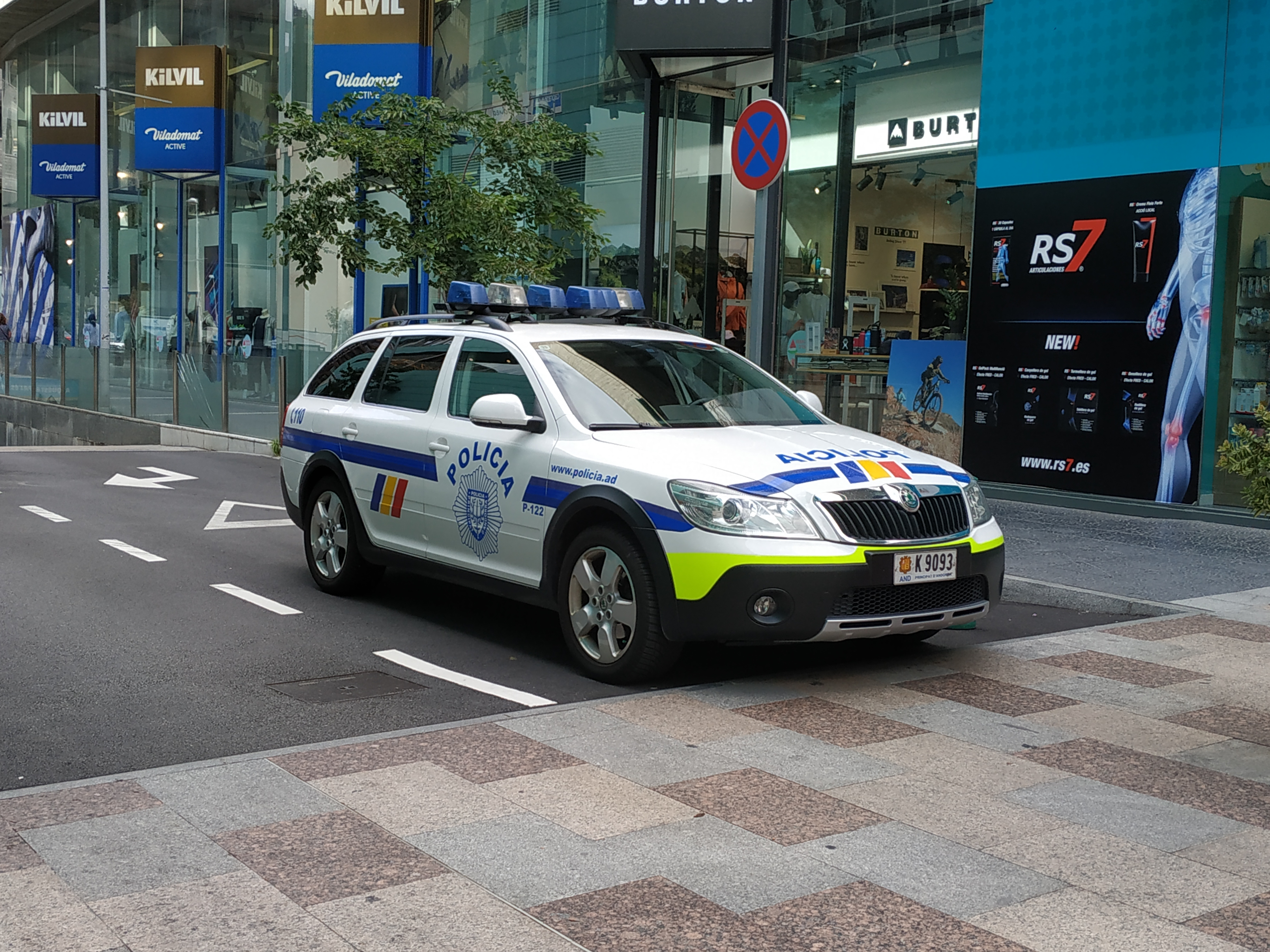
A Police Corps of Andorra patrol car in Andorra la Vella

The Police Corps of Andorra is the national police service and operates throughout the country under the Ministry of Justice and Interior. Its specialised intervention group, the Grup d'Intervenció de la Policia (GIPA), undertakes high-risk operations and trains with comparable police units in neighbouring countries, including in assault techniques and responses to hostage incidents.

Andorra has no armed forces. Under the 1993 Treaty of Good Neighbourliness, Friendship and Cooperation, France and Spain undertake to respect Andorra's sovereignty, independence and territorial integrity. If any of these is violated or threatened, they are to consult with the Andorran government on the measures needed to safeguard them. Before the creation of a professional police service in 1931, public order and security were provided by the parish Sometent, a communal militia led by a captain and a desener. A 1989 decree required every Andorran head of household to possess a hunting shotgun and ammunition for service when ordered. The decree has since been repealed.

The 2022 Civil Protection Act repealed the 1984 decree governing the Sometent and now regulates it as part of the civil-protection system. Each parish's Local Council designates participating residents aged 18 to 60, who must receive training and may be mobilised to assist with relief and mutual aid during emergencies.

== Economy ==
Tourism, the mainstay of Andorra's economy, accounts for roughly 80% of GDP. An estimated 8 million tourists visit annually, attracted by Andorra's duty-free status and by its summer and winter resorts.

One of the main sources of income in Andorra is from ski resorts, which total over 175 km (109 mi) of ski grounds. The sport brings in over 7 million visitors annually and an estimated 340 million euros per year, sustaining 2,000 direct and 10,000 indirect jobs at present since 2007.

The banking sector, with its tax haven status, also contributes substantially to the economy with revenues raised exclusively through import tariffs (the financial and insurance sector accounts for approximately 19% of GDP). However, during the Euro area crisis, the tourist industry suffered a decline, partly caused by a drop in the prices of goods in Spain, undercutting duty-free shopping and increasing unemployment. On 1 January 2012, a business tax of 10% was introduced, followed by a sales tax of 2% a year later, which raised just over 14 million euros in its first quarter.

Agricultural production is limited; only 1.7% of the land is arable, and most food has to be imported. Some tobacco is grown locally. The principal livestock activity is domestic sheep raising. Manufacturing output consists mainly of cigarettes, cigars, and furniture. Andorra's natural resources include hydroelectric power, mineral water, timber, iron ore, and lead.

Andorra is not a member of the European Union, but enjoys a special relationship with it, such as being treated as an EU member for trade in manufactured goods (no tariffs) and as a non-EU member for agricultural products. Andorra lacked a currency of its own and used both the French franc and the Spanish peseta in banking transactions until 31 December 1999, when both currencies were replaced by the EU's single currency, the euro. Coins and notes of both the franc and the peseta remained legal tender in Andorra until 31 December 2002. Andorra negotiated to issue its own euro coins, beginning in early 2015.

Andorra has historically had one of the world's lowest unemployment rates. In 2023 it stood at 1.5%.

On 31 May 2013, it was announced that Andorra intended to legislate for the introduction of an income tax by the end of June, against a background of increasing dissatisfaction with the existence of tax havens among EU members. The announcement was made following a meeting in Paris between the Prime Minister Antoni Martí and the French President and Prince of Andorra François Hollande. Hollande welcomed the move as part of a process of Andorra "bringing its taxation in line with international standards".

By the mid-2010s, the financial system comprised five banking groups, one specialised credit entity, eight investment undertaking management entities, three asset management companies, and 29 insurance companies, 14 of which are branches of foreign insurance companies authorised to operate in the principality. The last mergers between banks took place in 2022, bringing the Andorran financial sector to currently have 3 active banking groups.

=== Tourism ===
Skiing, hiking, cross-country running, and cycling are all popular sports tourism activities in Andorra. Andorra's economy is heavily built on tourism.

Andorra's ski season usually goes from late November to early April, depending on weather conditions. Outside of the ski season, some of the ski lift facilities continue to operate at lower capacity, facilitating access to popular view points such as the Tristaina solar viewpoint, a viewpoint–sundial located on the peak of Peyreguils at an altitude of 2,701 metres and a few metres from the geographical border between Andorra and France. This peak is part of the Tristaina cirque, along with the Costa Rodona, Tristaina, Creussans, and Cabanyó peaks.

=== Telecommunications ===
Andorra Telecom, the national telecom company in Andorra

In Andorra, mobile and fixed telephone and internet services are operated exclusively by the Andorran national telecommunications company, SOM, also known as Andorra Telecom (STA). The same company also manages the technical infrastructure for national broadcasting of digital television and radio. In 2010 Andorra became the first country to provide a direct optical fibre link to all homes (FTTH) and businesses.

=== Transport ===
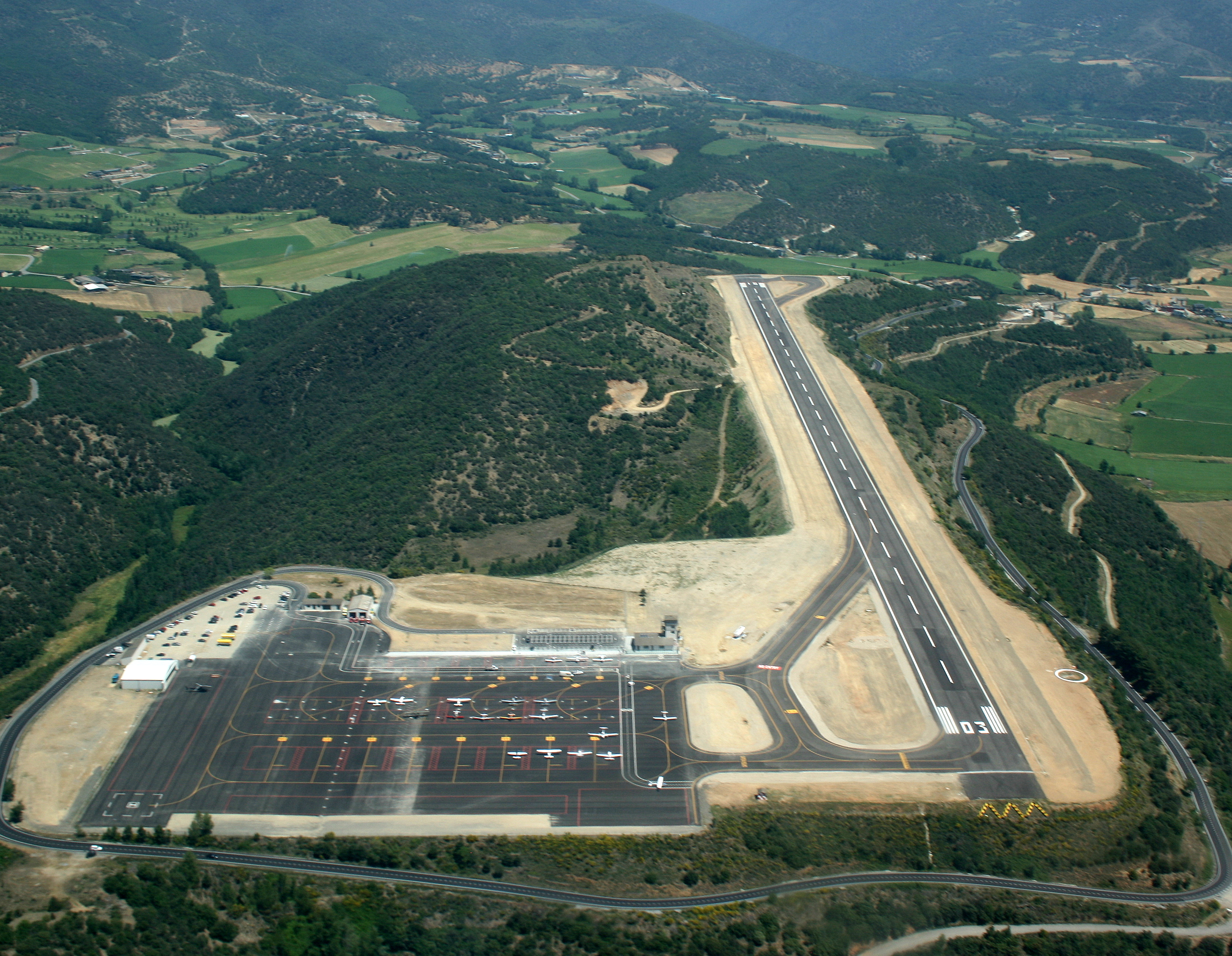
Andorra–La Seu d'Urgell Airport, located 12 km (7 mi) away from Andorra, in Montferrer i Castellbò (Catalonia, Eastern Spain)

Until the 20th century, Andorra had very limited transport links to the outside world, and development of the country was affected by its physical isolation.

Andorra has a road network of 279 km (173 mi), of which 76 km (47 mi) is unpaved. The two main roads out of Andorra la Vella are the CG-1 to the Spanish border near Sant Julià de Lòria, and the CG-2 to the French border via the Envalira Tunnel near El Pas de la Casa. Bus services cover all metropolitan areas and many rural communities, with services on most major routes running half-hourly or more frequently during peak travel times. There are frequent long-distance bus services from Andorra to Barcelona and Toulouse, plus a daily tour from the former city. Bus services mostly are run by private companies, but some local ones are operated by the government.

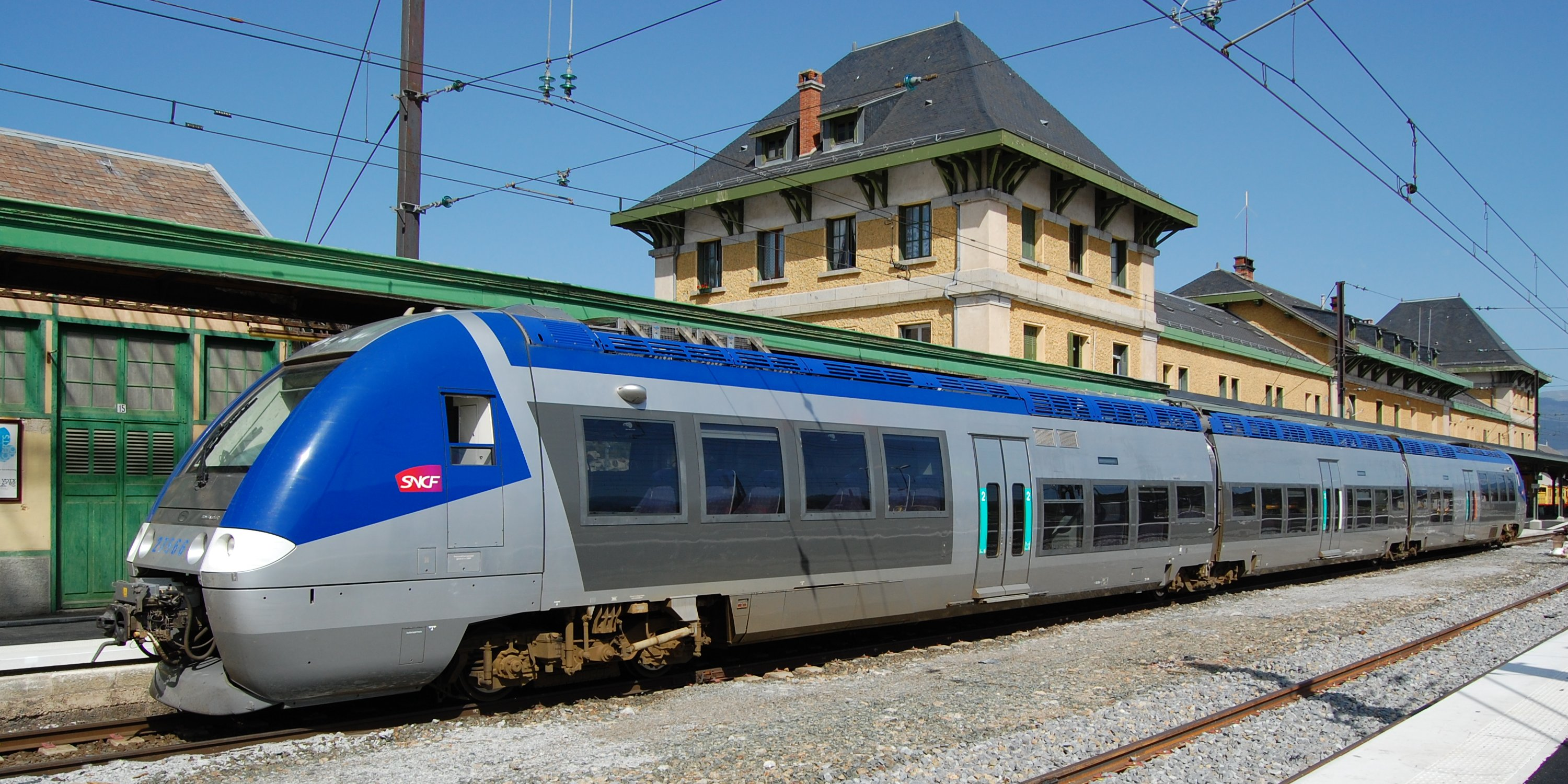
A train at Latour-de-Carol (La Tor de Querol), one of the two stations serving Andorra. Andorra has no railways, although the line connecting Latour-de-Carol and Toulouse, which in turn connects to France's TGVs at Toulouse, runs within two kilometres (one point two miles) of the Andorran border.

There are no airports for fixed-wing aircraft within Andorra's borders, but there are heliports in La Massana (Camí Heliport), Arinsal and Escaldes–Engordany with commercial helicopter services and an airport located in the neighbouring Spanish comarca of Alt Urgell, 12 km (7.5 mi) south of the Andorran–Spanish border. Since July 2015, Andorra–La Seu d'Urgell Airport has operated commercial flights to Madrid and Palma de Mallorca, and is the main hub for Andorra Airlines.

Nearby airports located in Spain and France provide access to international flights for the principality. The nearest international airports are Toulouse-Blagnac Airport, located 195 km (121 mi) north, and Josep Tarradellas Barcelona-El Prat Airport, located 198 km (123 mi) south east from Andorra. There are hourly bus services from both Barcelona and Toulouse airports to Andorra.

The nearest railway station is Andorre-L'Hospitalet station 10 km (6 mi) east of Andorra which is on the 1,435 mm (4 ft 8 1/2 in)-gauge line from Latour-de-Carol (25 km or 16 mi) southeast of Andorra, to Toulouse and on to Paris by the French high-speed trains. This line is operated by the SNCF. Latour-de-Carol has a scenic 1,000 mm (3 ft 3 3/8 in) metre gauge trainline to Villefranche-de-Conflent, as well as the SNCF's 1,435 mm-gauge line connecting to Perpignan, and the Renfe's 1,668 mm (5 ft 5 21/32 in) -gauge line to Barcelona. There are also direct Intercités de nuit trains between L'Hospitalet-près-l'Andorre and Paris on certain dates.

== Demographics ==
=== Population ===
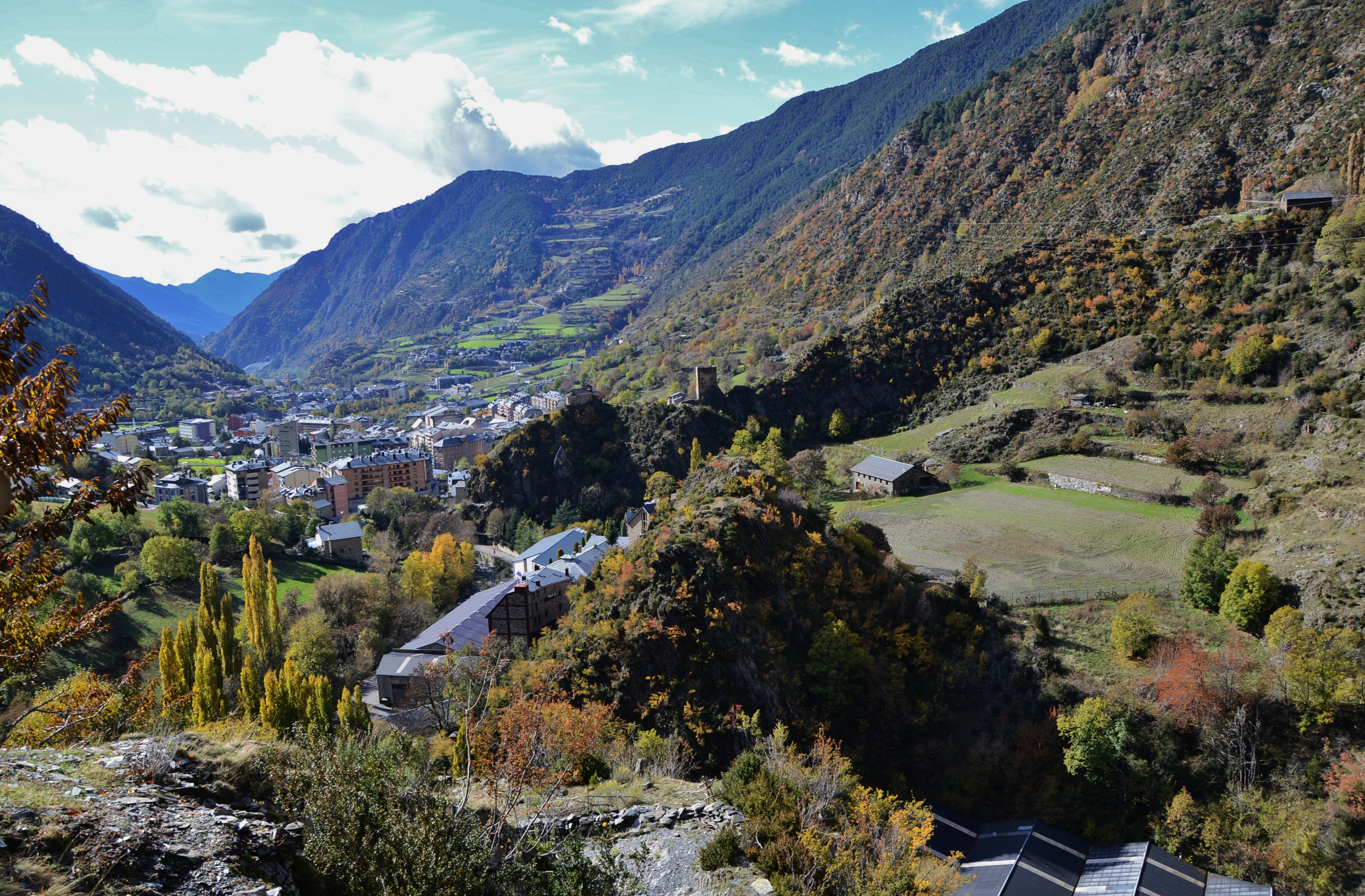
The town of Encamp, as seen from the Vall dels Cortals

The population of Andorra is estimated at 79,034 (2021). The Andorrans are a Romance ethnic group of originally Catalan descent. The population has grown from 5,000 in 1900.

Two-thirds of residents lack Andorran nationality and do not have the right to vote in communal elections. Moreover, they are not allowed to be elected as prime minister or to own more than 33% of the capital stock of a privately held company.

The largest national groups in Andorra are Spanish (34.3%), Andorrans (32.1%), Portuguese (10%), and French (5.6%). The remaining 18% of the population includes British, Dutch, Germans, Italians, and other Europeans, as well as Argentinians, Chileans, Indians, Moroccans, and Uruguayans. Population growth in Andorra in mainly due to young workers finding jobs in the tourism, hospitality and services sectors. Recent waves of immigrations come from South America, mainly Colombia and Peru.

=== Largest settlements ===
Largest settlements in Andorra Government of Andorra, Department d'Estadística, 2025
Rank	Name	Parish	Pop.
1	Andorra la Vella	Andorra la Vella	21,496
2	Escaldes-Engordany	Escaldes-Engordany	16,162
3	Encamp	Encamp	8,817
4	Sant Julià de Lòria	Sant Julià de Lòria	8,312
5	La Massana	La Massana	6,300
6	Ordino	Ordino	3,378
7	Santa Coloma	Andorra la Vella	3,340
8	Canillo	Canillo	2,623
9	El Pas de la Casa	Encamp	2,284
10	Arinsal	La Massana	2,210

=== Languages ===
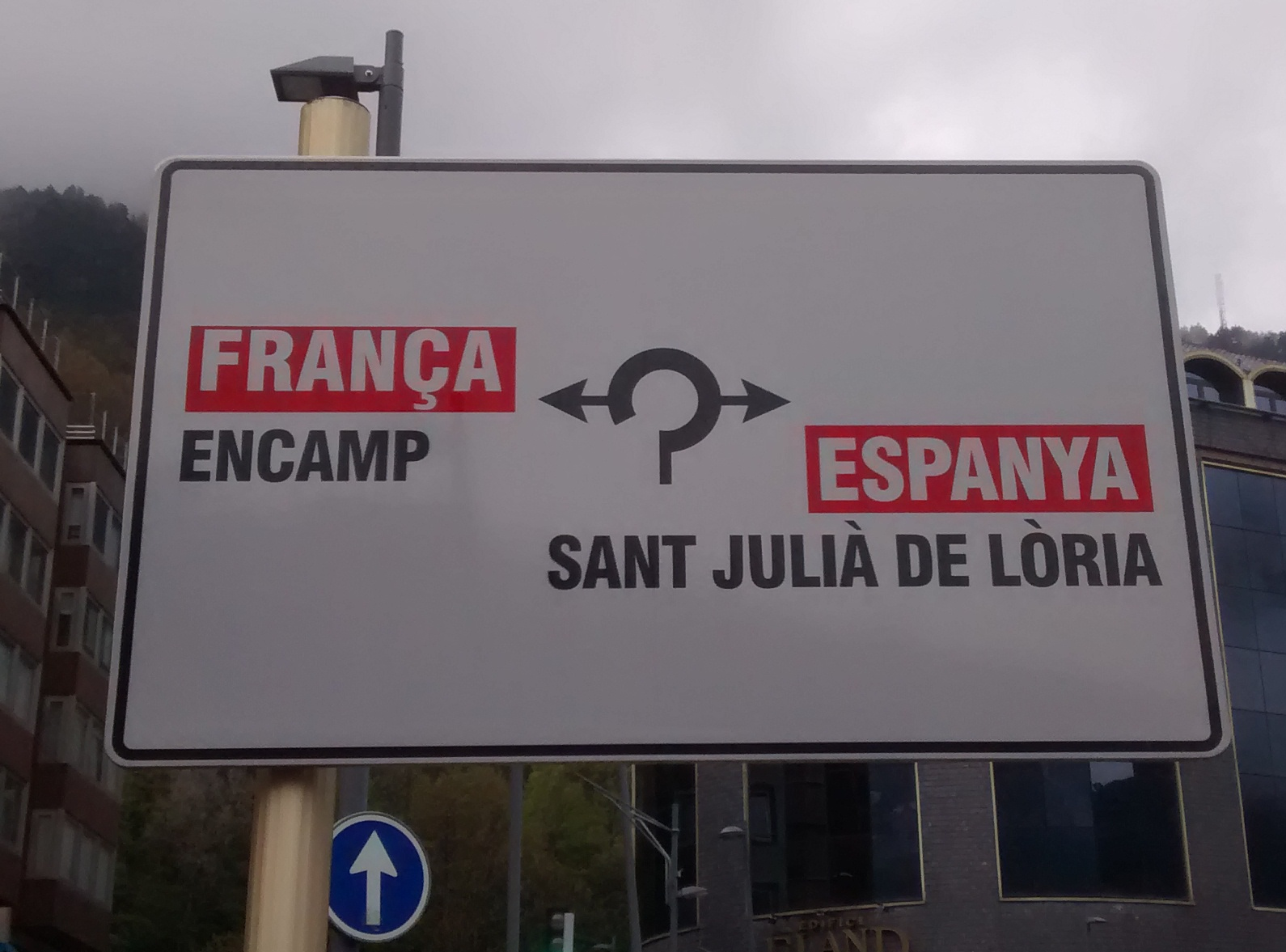
Most signage in Andorra is in Catalan

Catalan (and specifically its North-Western variety) is the traditional language of Andorra and its only official language. It is a Romance language also spoken in Spain, France and Italy.

Under Andorra's 2024 language law, Catalan is a "fundamental element of the identity, personality and cultural heritage of Andorra". The government promotes Catalan through free language courses, guided self-learning and sector-specific courses for businesses. The law also requires media outlets to use Catalan in programming and advertising, and requires public media to promote Andorra's linguistic heritage. It recognizes Catalan Sign Language as a linguistic system and establishes the right of deaf and deafblind people to learn and use it.

Because of immigration, historical links and geographic proximity, Spanish, Portuguese and French are also widely used. In the 2022 government survey, Catalan was reported by 44.1% of respondents as a mother tongue and by 63.7% as a usual language; Spanish by 40.3% and 48.6%, Portuguese by 13.5% and 6.6%, and French by 10.0% and 5.7%. English accounted for 3.0% of mother-tongue responses and 2.7% of usual-language responses. The same survey reported average language-knowledge scores, on a scale from 0 to 10, of 9.0 for understanding Catalan and 8.1 for speaking it; for English, the corresponding scores were 5.1 and 4.6.

Within the Council of Europe, Andorra is one of four member states, alongside France, Monaco and Turkey, that have neither signed nor ratified the Framework Convention for the Protection of National Minorities.

=== Religion ===
Religion of Andorra, 2020
1. Catholic (89.5%)
2. other (8.80%)
3. unaffiliated (1.70%)

Few official statistics are available on religion. The CIA World Factbook estimates the Catholic population in 2020 at 89.5%. The Statistical Yearbook of the Catholic Church 2022 reports that 98.6% of the population were baptised Catholics. The patron saint is Our Lady of Meritxell. There are also members of various Protestant denominations and small numbers of Hindus, and Bahá'ís. In 2022 there were approximately 2000 Muslims and roughly 100 Jews.

=== Education ===
The Qualified Education Law (llei qualificada d'educació) of Andorra was passed in 1993. It guarantees free, public education from age four until the end of compulsory schooling.

==== University of Andorra ====
The Universitat d'Andorra (UdA) is the state public university and is the only university in Andorra. It was established in 1997. The university provides first-level degrees in nursing, computer science, business administration, and educational sciences, in addition to higher professional education courses. The only two graduate schools in Andorra are the Nursing School and the School of Computer Science, the latter having a PhD programme.

===== Virtual Studies Centre =====
The geographical complexity of the country as well as the small number of students prevents the University of Andorra from developing a full academic programme, and it serves principally as a centre for virtual studies, connected to Spanish and French universities. The Virtual Studies Centre (Centre d'Estudis Virtuals) at the university runs approximately 20 different academic degrees at both undergraduate and postgraduate levels in fields including tourism, law, Catalan philology, humanities, psychology, political sciences, audiovisual communication, telecommunications engineering, and East Asia studies. The centre also runs various postgraduate programmes and continuing-education courses for professionals.

== Culture ==
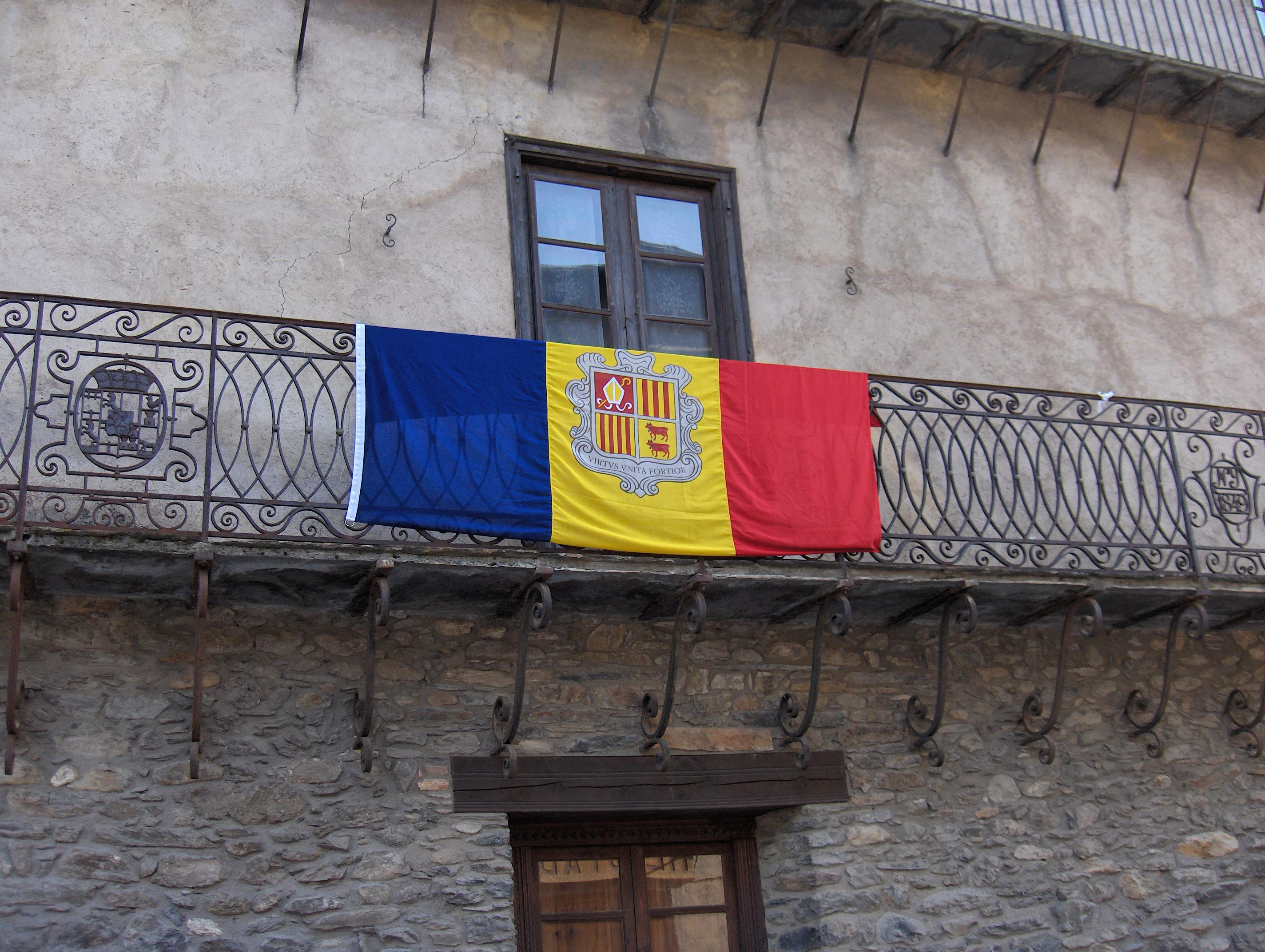
Andorran flag on a balcony, Ordino

Andorra is home to folk dances like the contrapàs and marratxa, which survive in Sant Julià de Lòria especially. Andorran folk music has similarities to the music of its neighbours, but is especially Catalan in character, especially in the presence of dances such as the sardana. Other Andorran folk dances include contrapàs in Andorra la Vella and Saint Anne's dance in Escaldes-Engordany. Andorra's national holiday is Our Lady of Meritxell Day, 8 September.

Among the more important festivals and traditions are the Canólich Gathering in May, the Roser d'Ordino in July, Meritxell Day (National Day of Andorra), the Andorra la Vella Fair, Sant Jordi Day, the Santa Llúcia Fair, the Festivity from La Candelera to Canillo, the Carnival of Encamp, the singing of caramelles, the Festivity of Sant Esteve and the Festa del Poble.

Andorra participated regularly in the Eurovision Song Contest between 2004 and 2009, being the only participating country presenting songs in Catalan.

In popular folklore, the best-known Andorran legends are the legend of Charlemagne, according to which this Frankish king would have founded the country, the White Lady of Auvinyà, the Buner d'Ordino, the legend of Engolasters Lake and the legend of Our Lady of Meritxell.

Andorran gastronomy is mainly Catalan, although it has also adopted other elements of French and Italian cuisines. The cuisine of the country has similar characteristics with the neighbours of Cerdanya and Alt Urgell, with which it has strong cultural ties. Andorra's cuisine is defined by its mountain valleys. Typical dishes of the country are quince all-i-oli, duck with winter pear, roast lamb with nuts, pork civet, massegada cake, escarole with pears, duck confit and mushrooms, escudella, spinach with raisins and pine nuts, jelly marmalade, stuffed murgues (mushrooms) with pork, dandelion salad, and Andorran river trout. To drink, mulled wine and beer are also popular. Some of the dishes are very common in the mountainous regions of Catalonia, such as trinxat, embotits, cooked snails, rice with mushrooms, mountain rice and mató.

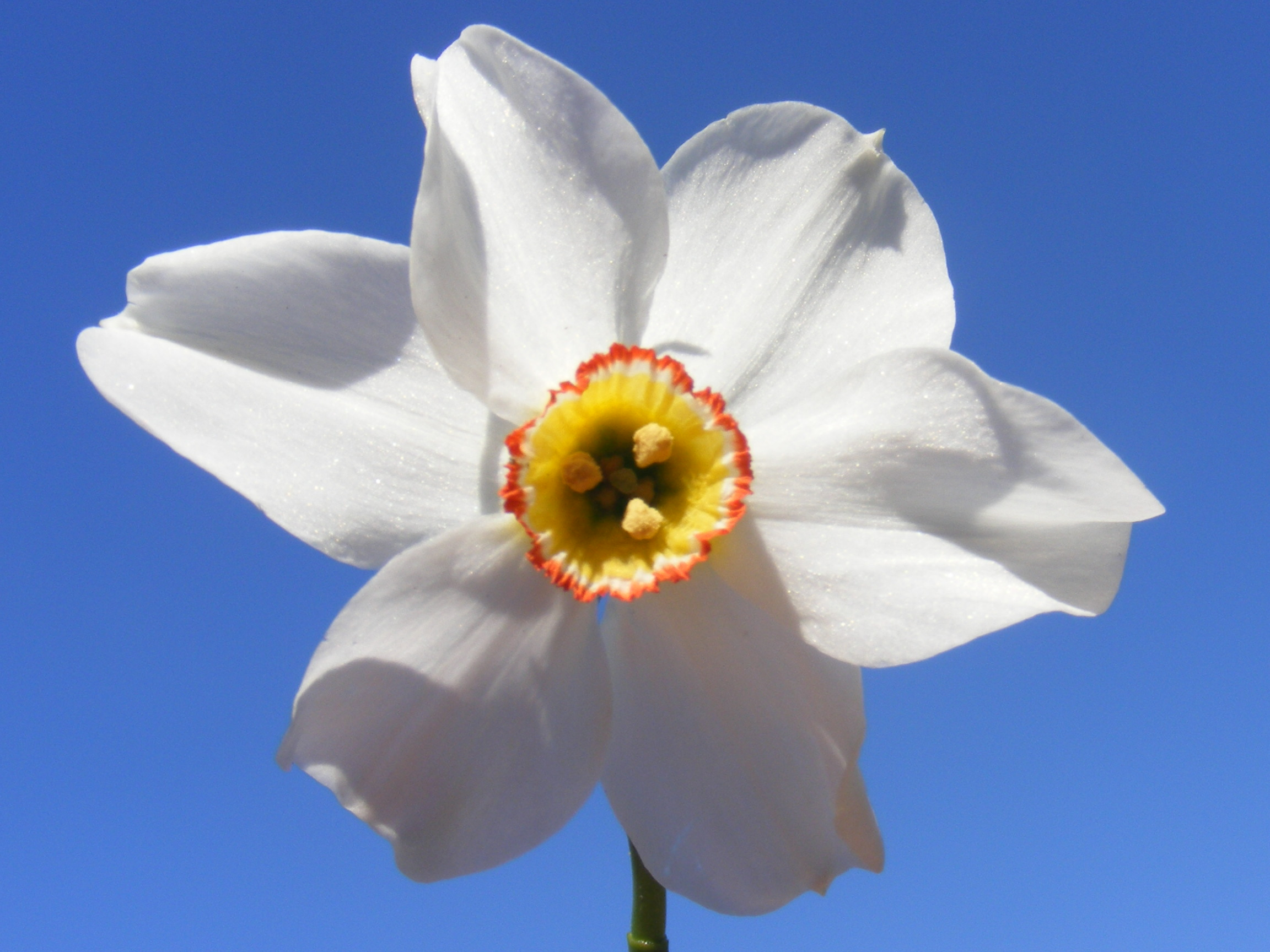
Grandalla flower, the national symbol

Pre-Romanesque and Romanesque art are some of the most important artistic manifestations and characteristics of the Principality. The Romanesque style helps to understand the formation of the parochial communities, the relations of (social and political) power and the national culture. There are a total of forty Romanesque churches that stand out as being small austere ornamentation constructions, as well as bridges, fortresses and manor houses of the same period.

Summer solstice fire festivals in the Pyrenees were included as UNESCO Intangible cultural heritage in 2015. Also, the Madriu-Perafita-Claror Valley became Andorra's first, and to date its only, UNESCO World Heritage Site in 2004, with a small extension in 2006.

=== Media ===
RTVA, the public service television and radio broadcaster in Andorra

There are three national newspapers, Diari d'Andorra, El Periòdic d'Andorra, and Bondia, as well as several local newspapers. The history of the Andorran press begins in the period between 1917 and 1937 with the appearance of several periodicals such as Les Valls d'Andorra (1917), Nova Andorra (1932), and Andorra Agrícola (1933). In 1974, the Poble Andorrà became the first regular newspaper in Andorra. There is also an amateur radio society and news agency ANA with independent management.

The first commercial radio station to broadcast was Radio Andorra, which was active from 1939 to 1981. On 12 October 1989, the General Council established radio and television as essential public services creating and managing the entity ORTA, becoming on 13 April 2000, in the public company Ràdio i Televisió d'Andorra (RTVA). In 1990, the public radio was founded on the Radio Nacional d'Andorra. As an autochthonous television channel, there is only the national public television network Andorra Televisió, created in 1995. Additional TV and radio stations from Spain and France are available via digital terrestrial television and IPTV.

=== Sports ===
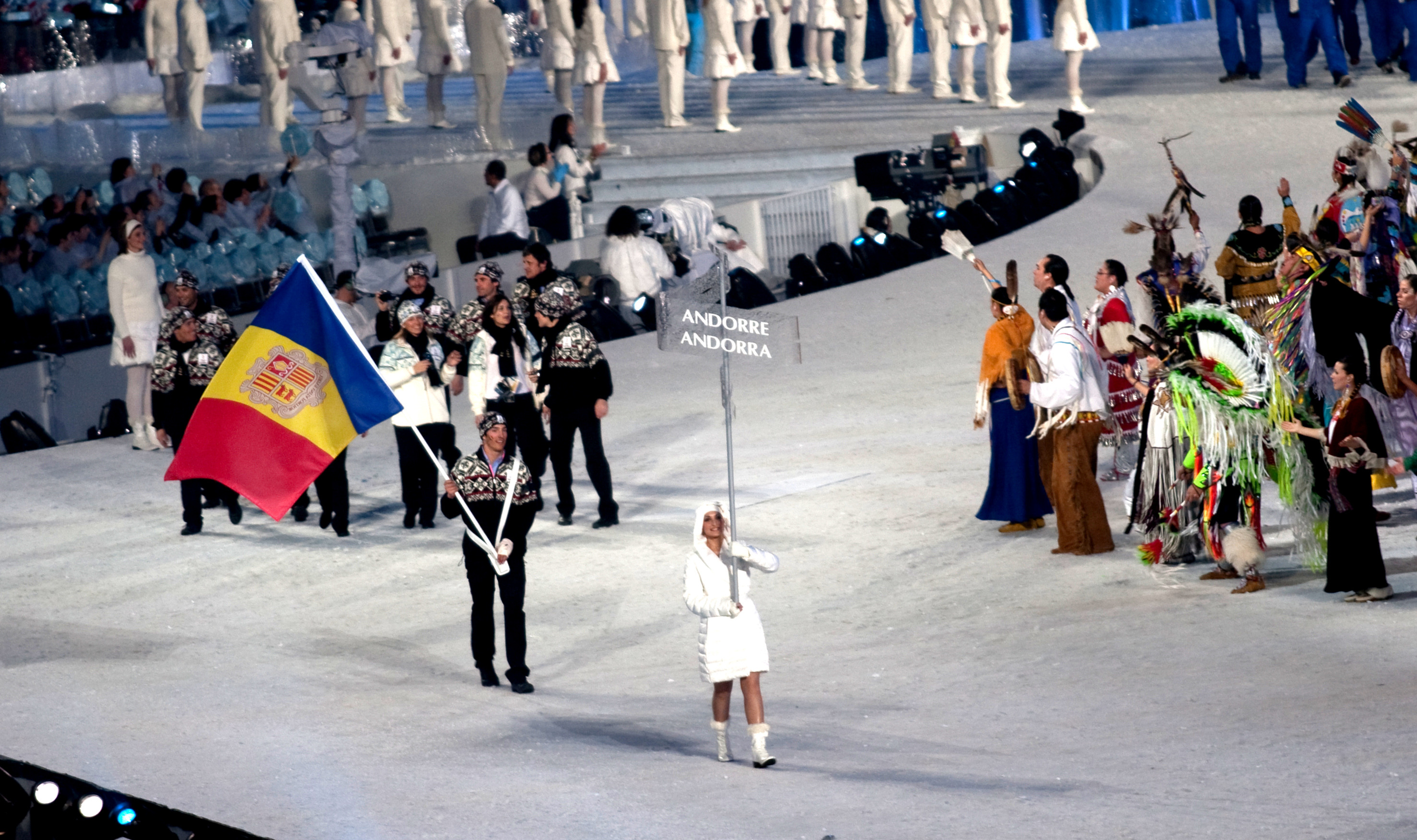
The athletes from Andorra at the opening ceremonies of the 2010 Winter Olympics

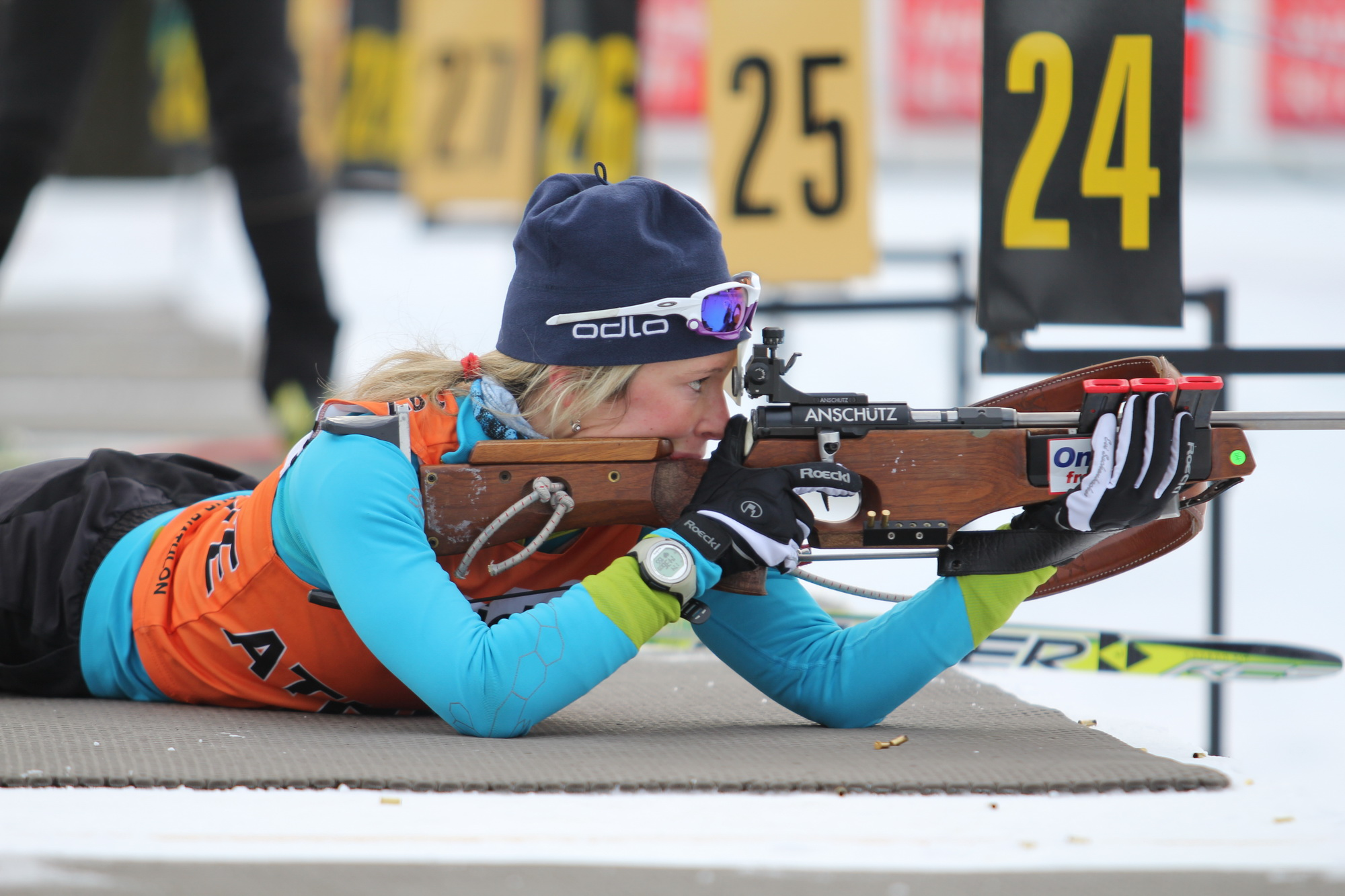
Laure Soulié, Olympic biathlete

Andorra is well known for its winter sports. Andorra has a large territory of ski slopes in the Pyrenees (3100 hectares and about 350 km of slopes) and two ski resorts. Grandvalira is the largest and busiest resort. Other sports commonly played in Andorra include football, rugby union, basketball, and roller hockey.

In roller hockey, Andorra usually plays in the CERH Euro Cup and FIRS Roller Hockey World Cup. In 2011, Andorra was the host country to the 2011 European League Final Eight.

The country is represented in association football by the Andorra national football team. The team gained its first competitive win in a European Championship qualifier on 11 October 2019, against Moldova. Football is governed in Andorra by the Andorran Football Federation; founded in 1994, it organises the national competitions of association football (Primera Divisió, Copa Constitució and Supercopa), and futsal. Andorra was admitted to UEFA and FIFA in 1996. FC Andorra, a club based in Andorra la Vella founded in 1942, compete in the Spanish football league system.

Rugby is a traditional sport in Andorra, mainly influenced by its popularity in southern France. The Andorra national rugby union team, nicknamed Els Isards, plays on the international stage in rugby union and rugby sevens. VPC Andorra XV is a rugby team based in Andorra la Vella, which actually plays in the French championship.

Basketball's popularity has increased in the country since the 1990s, when the Andorran team BC Andorra played in the top league of Spain (Liga ACB). After 18 years the club returned to the top league in 2014.

Other sports practised in Andorra include cycling, volleyball, judo, Australian rules football, handball, swimming, gymnastics, tennis, and motorsports. In 2012, Andorra raised its first national cricket team and played a home match against the Dutch Fellowship of Fairly Odd Places Cricket Club, the first match played in the history of Andorra at an altitude of 1,300 metres (4,300 ft).

Andorra first participated at the Olympic Games in 1976. The country has appeared in every Winter Olympic Games since 1976. Andorra competes in the Games of the Small States of Europe, being the host country on three occasions, in 1991, 2005 and 2025.

As one of the Catalan Countries, Andorra is home to a team of castellers, or Catalan human tower builders. The Castellers d'Andorra, based in the town of Santa Coloma d'Andorra, are recognised by the Coordinadora de Colles Castelleres de Catalunya, the governing body of castells.

== See also ==
- Index of Andorra-related articles
- Outline of Andorra
- Bibliography of Andorra

== Bibliography ==
- Armengol Aleix, E. (2009). Andorra: un profund i llarg viatge (in Catalan). Andorra: Government of Andorra. ISBN 978-99920-0-549-1.
- Guillamet Anton, J. (2009). Andorra: nova aproximació a la història d'Andorra (in Catalan). Andorra: Revista Altaïr. ISBN 978-84-936220-4-6.
- Llop Rovira, Marta (1998). "L'Edat Moderna a Andorra (S. XVII al XVIII)". Història, Geografia i Institucions d'Andorra. Government of Andorra. ISBN 99920-0-185-2.
- Ministeri d'Educació, Joventut i Esports (1996). "L'Edat Antiga i Mitjana a Andorra". Història, Geografia i Institucions d'Andorra. Government of Andorra.
- Peruga Guerrero, J. (1998). La crisi de la societat tradicional (S. XIX) (in Catalan). Andorra: Segona Ensenyança. ISBN 978-99920-0-186-8.
