= Pont dels Escalls =

Bridge in Escaldes-Engordany, Andorra

Coordinates: 42.5133°N 1.5348°E

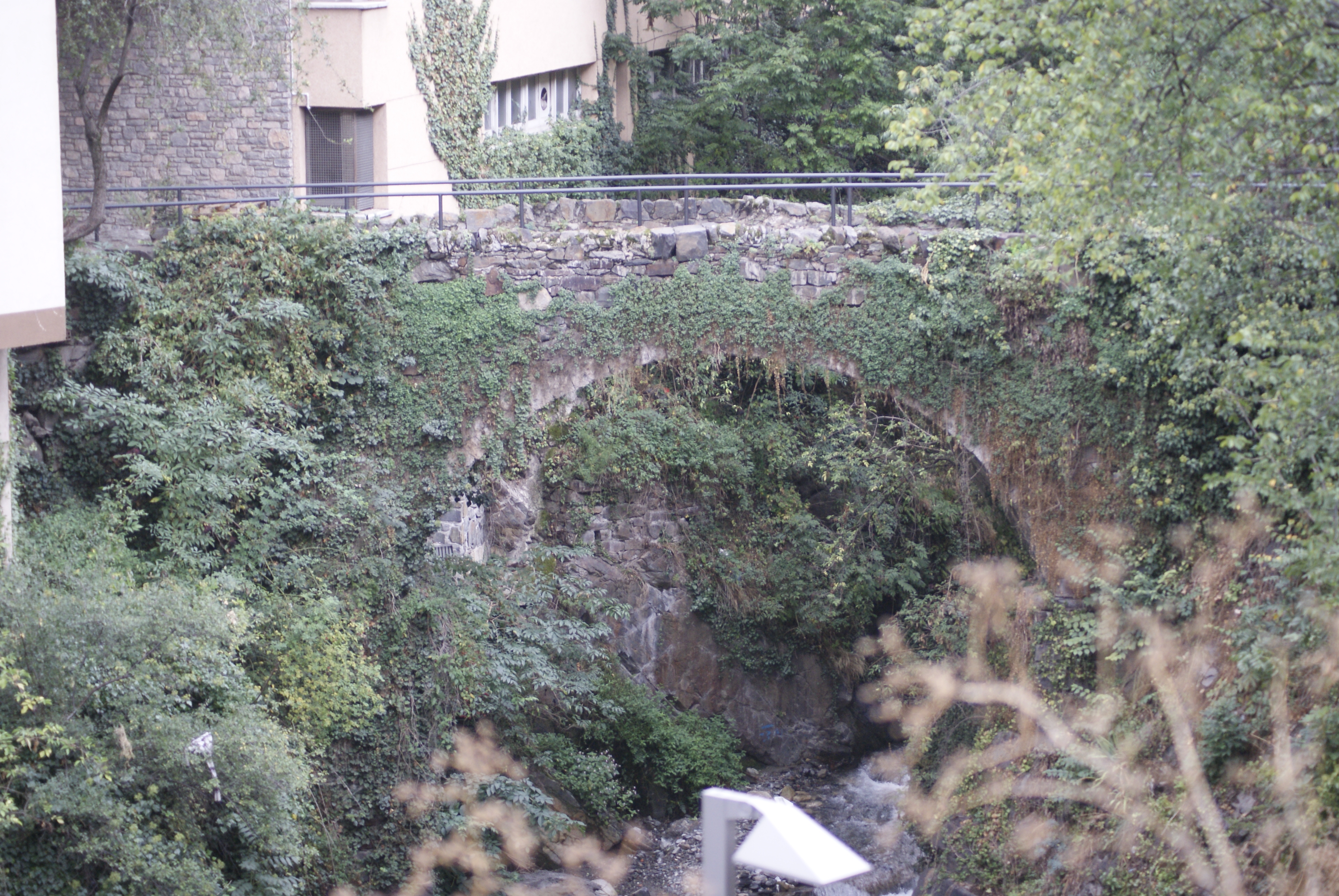
Pont dels Escalls

Pont dels Escalls is a bridge located in Escaldes-Engordany Parish, Andorra, built in the thirteenth century. It is a heritage property registered in the Cultural Heritage of Andorra. It is historically important because, according to tradition, it was the place where the creation of the Principality of Andorra was signed between the bishop of Urgell and the count of Foix.
