= Església de Sant Miquel d'Engolasters =

Church in Escaldes-Engordany, Andorra

Coordinates: 42°30′41″N 1°33′37″E

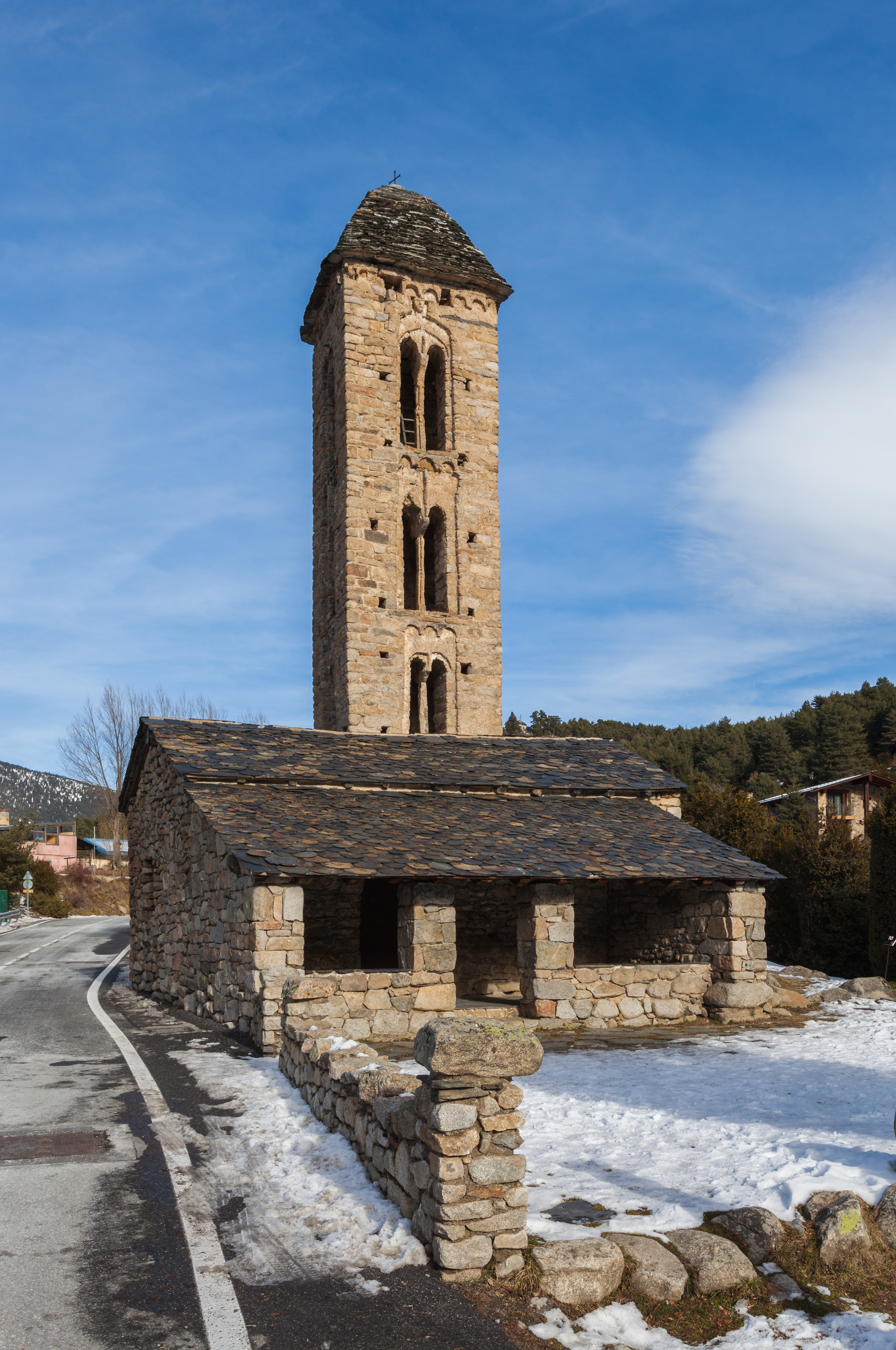
Església de Sant Miquel d'Engolasters

Església de Sant Miquel d'Engolasters is a church located in Engolasters, Escaldes-Engordany Parish, Andorra. It is a heritage property registered in the Cultural Heritage of Andorra. It was built originally in the 11-12th century.
