= Cal Pal =

Historic house in Ordino, Andorra

Coordinates: 42.5759°N 1.5189°E

- Cal Pal (Catalan)
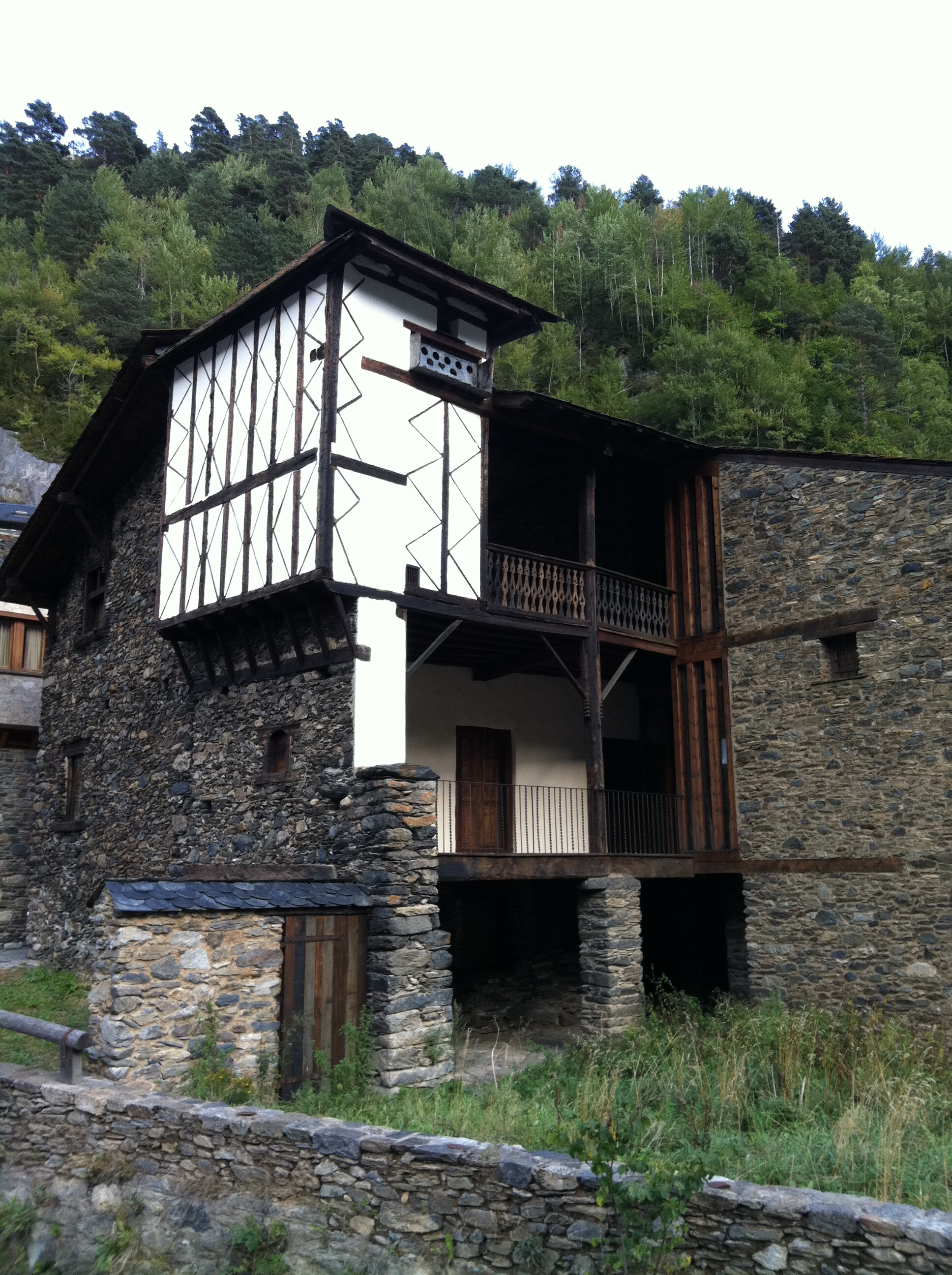

- Location in Andorra
- Location: La Cortinada, Ordino, Andorra

History
- Built: 1347

Cal Pal is a house located at La Cortinada, Ordino Parish, Andorra. It is a heritage property registered in the Cultural Heritage of Andorra. It was built in 1347.
