= 2005 Volta a Catalunya =

Race details
- Dates: 16 May — 22 May
- Stages: 7
- Distance: 930.4 km (578.1 mi)
- Winning time: 22h 56' 36"

Results
	Winner	Yaroslav Popovych (UKR)	(Discovery Channel)
	Second	Leonardo Piepoli (ITA)	(Saunier Duval–Prodir)
	Third	David Moncoutié (FRA)	(Cofidis)
	Points	Thor Hushovd (NOR)	(Crédit Agricole)
	Mountains	Íñigo Cuesta (ESP)	(Saunier Duval–Prodir)
	Sprints	Eladio Jiménez (ESP)	(Comunidad Valenciana–Elche)
	Team	(France) Cofidis	

The 2005 Volta a Catalunya was the 85th edition of the Volta a Catalunya cycling race, which took place from 16 May to 22 May 2005, in Catalonia, Spain. The race began in Salou with a team time trial and ended in Barcelona. Yaroslav Popovych won the first major win of his career.

== Teams ==
Twenty-three teams of up to eight riders started the race:

- Phonak
- Davitamon–Lotto
- Quick-Step–Innergetic
- Team CSC
- Euskaltel–Euskadi
- Illes Balears–Caisse d'Epargne
- Liberty Seguros–Würth
- Saunier Duval–Prodir
- Bouygues Télécom
- Crédit Agricole
- Cofidis
- Française des Jeux
- Gerolsteiner
- T-Mobile Team
- Domina Vacanze
- Fassa Bortolo
- Lampre–Caffita
- Liquigas–Bianchi
- Rabobank
- Discovery Channel
- Kaiku
- Comunidad Valenciana–Elche
- Relax–Fuenlabrada

== Route ==
Stage characteristics and winners
Stage	Date	Course	Distance	Type	Winner
1	16 May	Salou to Salou	19.2 km (11.9 mi)	Team time trial	Phonak
2	17 May	Cambrils to Cambrils	186.8 km (116.1 mi)		Enrico Gasparotto (ITA)
3	18 May	Salou to La Granada	157.8 km (98.1 mi)		Pedro Horrillo (ESP)
4	19 May	Perafort to Pal-Arinsal	237.7 km (147.7 mi)		Leonardo Piepoli (ITA)
5	20 May	Sornàs to Ordino-Arcalis	17.1 km (10.6 mi)	Individual time trial	Íñigo Cuesta (ESP)
6	21 May	Llívia to Pallejà	198.7 km (123.5 mi)		Anthony Charteau (FRA)
7	22 May	Pallejà to Barcelona	113.1 km (70.3 mi)		Thor Hushovd (NOR)

== Stages ==
=== Stage 1 ===
16 May 2005 - Salou, 20.1 km (12.5 mi) (TTT)

Rank	Rider	Team	Time
1	Phonak	Switzerland	21' 42"
2	Discovery Channel	United States	+ 7"
3	T-Mobile Team	Germany	+ 15"

=== Stage 2 ===
17 May 2005 - Cambrils, 186.8 kilometres (116.1 mi)

Rank	Rider	Team	Time
1	Enrico Gasparotto (ITA)	Liquigas–Bianchi	4h 48' 39"
2	Claudio Corioni (ITA)	Fassa Bortolo	s.t.
3	Thor Hushovd (NOR)	Crédit Agricole	s.t.

=== Stage 3 ===
18 May 2005 - Salou to La Granada, 157.8 km (98.1 mi)

Rank	Rider	Team	Time
1	Pedro Horrillo (ESP)	Rabobank	3h 35' 59"
2	Thor Hushovd (NOR)	Crédit Agricole	s.t.
3	Claudio Corioni (ITA)	Fassa Bortolo	s.t.

=== Stage 4 ===
19 May 2005 - Perafort to Pal-Arinsal, 237.7 km (147.7 mi)

Rank	Rider	Team	Time
1	Leonardo Piepoli (ITA)	Saunier Duval–Prodir	6h 22' 09"
2	Yaroslav Popovych (UKR)	Discovery Channel	s.t.
3	Aitor Osa (ESP)	Illes Balears–Caisse d'Epargne	s.t.

=== Stage 5 ===
20 May 2005 - Sornàs to Ordino-Arcalis, 17 km (11 mi) (ITT)

Rank	Rider	Team	Time
1	Íñigo Cuesta (ESP)	Saunier Duval–Prodir	37' 18"
2	Leonardo Piepoli (ITA)	Saunier Duval–Prodir	+ 25"
3	David Moncoutié (FRA)	Cofidis	+ 45"

=== Stage 6 ===
21 May 2005 - Llívia to Pallejà, 198.7 km (123.5 mi)

Rank	Rider	Team	Time
1	Anthony Charteau (FRA)	Bouygues Télécom	4h 16' 54"
2	Beat Zberg (SUI)	Gerolsteiner	+ 4"
3	José Luis Arrieta (ESP)	Illes Balears–Caisse d'Epargne	+ 4"

=== Stage 7 ===
22 May 2005 - Pallejà to Barcelona, 113.1 km (70.3 mi)

Rank	Rider	Team	Time
1	Thor Hushovd (NOR)	Crédit Agricole	2h 32' 57"
2	Fred Rodriguez (USA)	Davitamon–Lotto	s.t.
3	Miguel Ángel Martín Perdiguero (ESP)	Phonak	s.t.

== Final standings ==
=== General classification ===
Rank	Rider	Team	Time
1	Yaroslav Popovych (UKR)	Discovery Channel	22h 36' 56"
2	Leonardo Piepoli (ITA)	Saunier Duval–Prodir	+ 20"
3	David Moncoutié (FRA)	Cofidis	+ 59"
4	Michael Rogers (AUS)	Quick-Step–Innergetic	+ 1' 18"
5	Aitor Osa (ESP)	Illes Balears–Caisse d'Epargne	+ 1' 23"
6	Miguel Ángel Martín (ESP)	Phonak	+ 2' 01"
7	Eladio Jiménez (ESP)	Comunidad Valenciana–Elche	+ 2' 09"
8	Íñigo Cuesta (ESP)	Saunier Duval–Prodir	+ 2' 18"
9	Christophe Moreau (FRA)	Crédit Agricole	+ 2' 20"
10	Ezequiel Mosquera (ESP)	Kaiku	+ 2' 25"

=== Mountains classification ===
Rank	Rider	Team	Points
1	Íñigo Cuesta (ESP)	Saunier Duval–Prodir	

=== Points classification ===
Rank	Rider	Team	Points
1	Thor Hushovd (NOR)	Crédit Agricole	

=== Best team ===
Rank	Team	Country	Time
1	Cofidis	France	
