= Arans =

Village in Ordino, Andorra

- Location in Andorra
- Coordinates: 42°35′N 1°31′E
- Country: Andorra
- Parish: Ordino
- Elevation: 1,385 m (4,544 ft)

Population (Dec. 2019)
  - Total: 238
- Postal code: AD300

Arans (Catalan pronunciation: [aˈɾans]) is a village in Andorra, located in the parish of Ordino in the north of the country. It is situated on the right bank of the Valira del Nord river, between Llorts and La Cortinada, and next to the CG-3 road leading to the Ordino Arcalís ski resort and Sorteny National Park, the largest nature area of Andorra. With a population of 238, Arans is the fourth biggest settlement in the parish of Ordino, after the town of Ordino (population: 3146), La Cortinada (population: 874) and Sornàs (population: 294).

== Main sights ==
The Andorran Iron Route (in Catalan: la Ruta del Ferro a Andorra) is an easy family-friendly hiking route that runs through Arans. The trail explores Andorra's historic mining and iron working industries that were active from the 17th century until the end of the 19th century.
