= Santi López =

Andorran alpine skier (born 1975)

Personal information
- Full name: Santi López Prats
- Born: 24 March 1975 (age 50); Ordino, Andorra

Sport
- Country: Andorra
- Sport: Alpine skiing

Santi López Prats (Note: In this Catalan name, the first or paternal surname is López and the second or maternal family name is Prats; both are generally joined by the conjunction "i".) (born 24 March 1975) is an Andorran alpine skier. He competed in the men's super-G at the 1994 Winter Olympics.
