= Església de Sant Corneli i Sant Cebrià d'Ordino =

Church in Ordino, Andorra

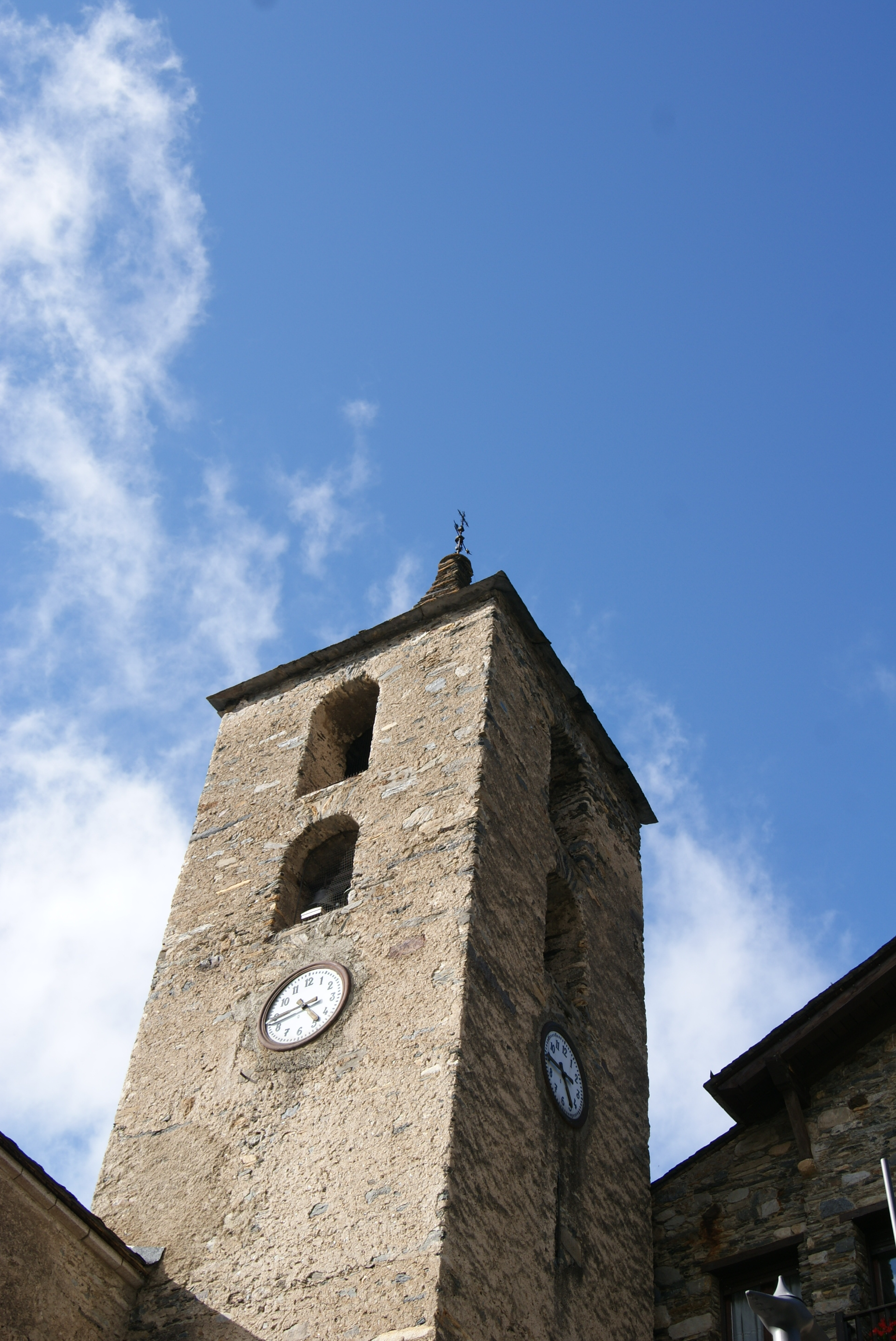
- Església de Sant Corneli i Sant Cebrià d'Ordino
- 42.5569°N 1.5329°E
- Location: Ordino, Andorra
- Country: Andorra
- Denomination: Catholic Church
- Sui iuris church: Latin Church

Església de Sant Corneli i Sant Cebrià d'Ordino is a church located in Ordino, Andorra. Originally constructed with Romanesque architecture, the church has been frequently renovated and modified over the centuries. The Cultural Heritage of Andorra listed the church as an asset of cultural interest in 2003.

== History ==
Located in the western portion of Ordino, the date of construction for Església de Sant Corneli i Sant Cebrià d'Ordino is unknown, but the earliest known mention of it was in the act of consecration for the church in La Seu d'Urgell. It is unknown if Església de Sant Corneli i Sant Cebrià d'Ordino was built upon a prior church. It is within the Roman Catholic Diocese of Urgell. The Cultural Heritage of Andorra listed the church as an asset of cultural interest on 16 July 2003.

== Structure ==
Stone bounded with lime mortar was used for the façade and the plaster is made of cement and red sand. There are four side chapels inside the building. The nave has two side chapels and the building is rectangular in shape with a square presbytery.

Originally constructed with Romanesque architecture, the church has been frequently renovated and modified and none of the original material remains. The number of chapels was modified in the 18th century, the bell tower was partially rebuilt and the nave raised in the 19th century, and the roof was lowered in 1985.

== Art ==
There are five Baroque altarpieces from the 17th and 18th centuries in the church. The main alter is beneath a carving of Virgin of Los Remedios from the 14th century. The church has the smallest Romanesque carving of Mary, mother of Jesus, at 44 cm x 18 cm.

== Works cited ==
- "Església de Sant Corneli i Sant Cebrià". Cultural Heritage of Andorra. Archived from the original on 2 May 2012.
- "Sant Corneli i Sant Cebrià d'Ordino". Gran Enciclopèdia Catalana. Archived from the original on 29 April 2025.
