= Segudet =

Village in Ordino, Andorra

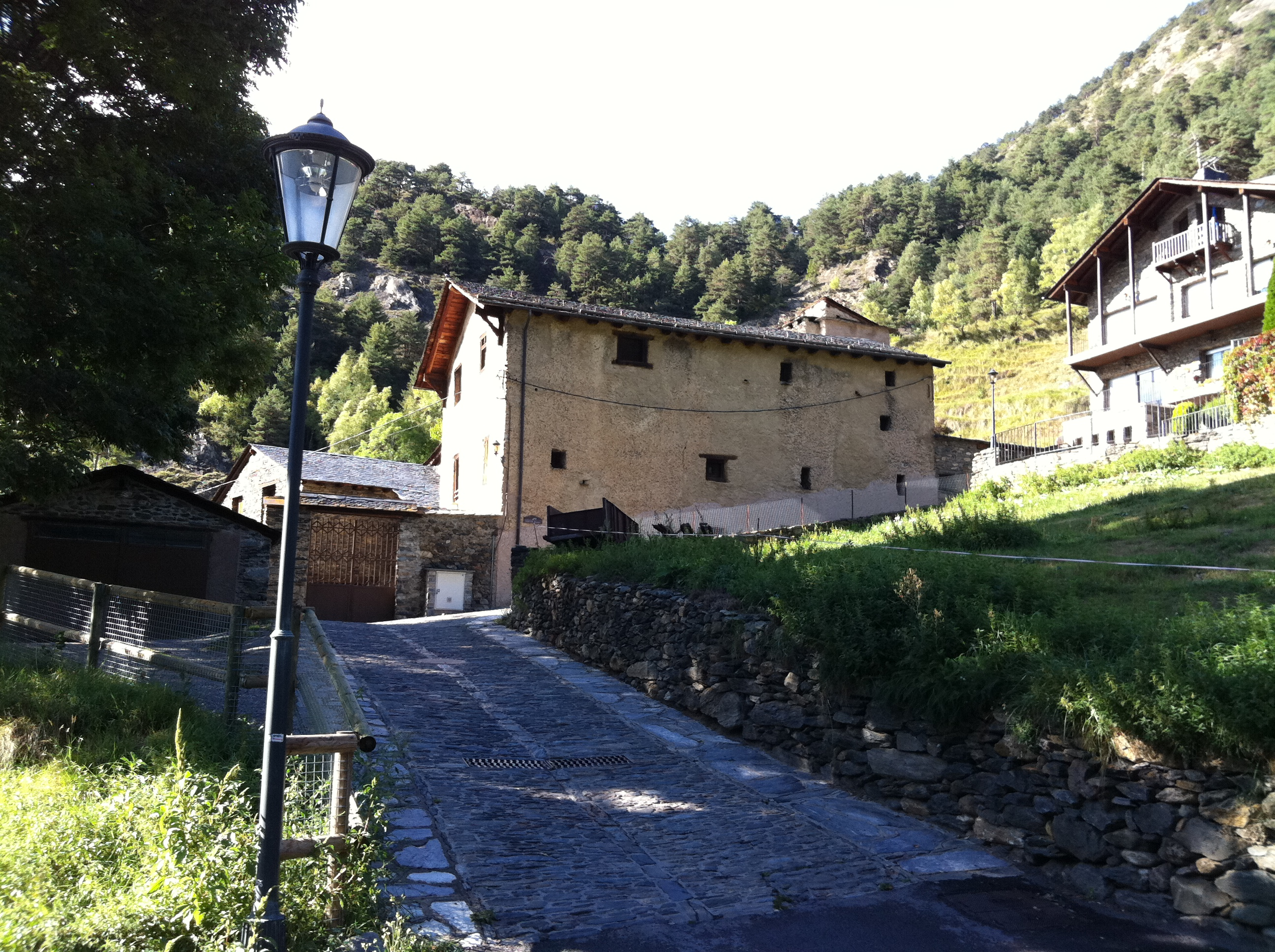

- Location in Andorra
- Coordinates: 42°33′N 1°32′E
- Country: Andorra
- Parish: Ordino
- Elevation: 1,722 m (5,650 ft)

Population (2012)
  - Total: 45

Segudet (Catalan pronunciation: [seɣuˈðet]) is a village in Andorra, located in the parish of Ordino.
