= Església de Sant Martí de la Cortinada =

Church in La Cortinada, Andorra

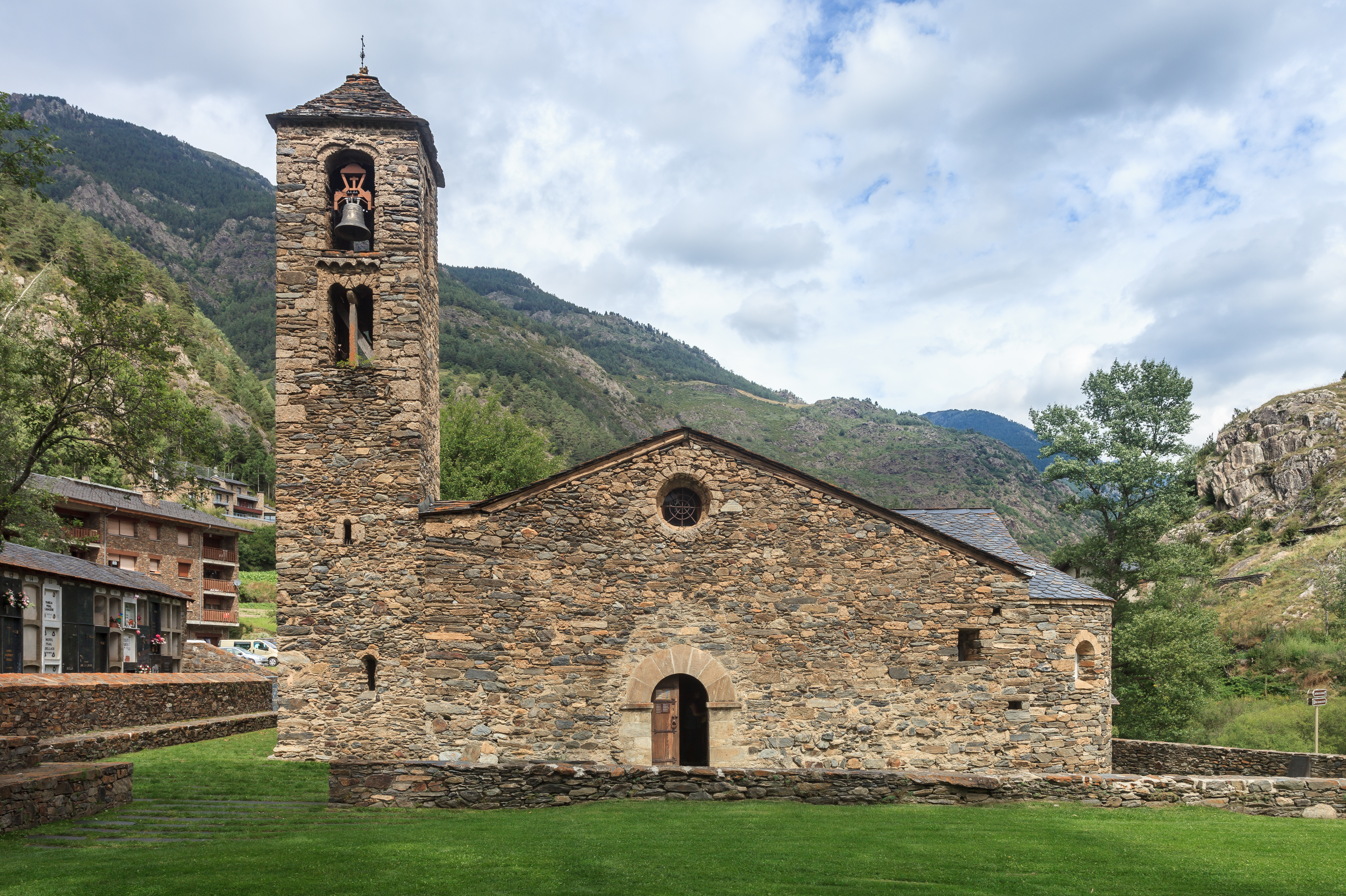
- Església de Sant Martí de la Cortinada
- 42°34′36″N 1°31′04″E
- Location: La Cortinada, Ordino, Andorra
- Country: Andorra
- Denomination: Catholic Church
- Sui iuris church: Latin Church

Església de Sant Martí de la Cortinada is a church located in La Cortinada, Ordino, Andorra. Originally built using Romanesque architecture, renovations from the 17–20th centuries have added Baroque architecture. The Cultural Heritage of Andorra registered the church as an asset of cultural interest on 16 July 2003.

== History ==
Constructed before the second half of the 12th century, Església de Sant Julià i Sant Germà is located in La Cortinada, Ordino, Andorra. A restoration of the southern area of the church was conducted in 1968. The Cultural Heritage of Andorra listed the church as an asset of cultural interest on 16 July 2003. The most recent renovations were carried out in 1995, but the Ministry of Culture has approved renovations for 2025. 5,289 visitors and tourists came to the church from July to August 2024.

== Structure ==
Originally constructed using Romanesque architecture, renovations have added Baroque architecture to the church. Renovations turned the nave into a quadrangular shape and its orientation was changed. Significant expansions and alterations were made to the building in the 16th and 17th centuries. The apse was rebuilt in the 20th century and is deeper than the original. The bell tower is located at the foot of the nave, which is uncommon in Andorran Romanesque architecture.

There are four altarpieces in the church, including the main one. The three other altarpieces are dedicated to Mary, mother of Jesus, Anthony of Padua, and Our Lady of the Rosary.

== Art ==
Pere Canturri Montanya dated the paintings in the church back to the 12th century. In 1968, Romanesque paintings in the original apse that were covered up by later extensions were discovered. The original key to the church was maintained until it was stolen in the mid-20th century; there is now a 25 cm x 10.3 cm replica.

== Works cited ==
=== News ===
- "Sant Martí de la Cortinada, al quiròfan". Bondia. 2 October 2024. Archived from the original on 30 April 2025.
- Mencos, Anna (21 September 2024). "L'art i l'arquitectura romànica triomfen". Altaveu. Archived from the original on 30 April 2025.

=== Web ===
- "Església de Sant Martí de la Cortinada". Cultural Heritage of Andorra. Archived from the original on 9 May 2012.
- "Sant Martí de la Cortinada (Ordino)". Gran Enciclopèdia Catalana. Archived from the original on 30 April 2025.
