= Casa Rossell =

Manor house in Ordino, Andorra

Coordinates: 42.5563°N 1.5338°E

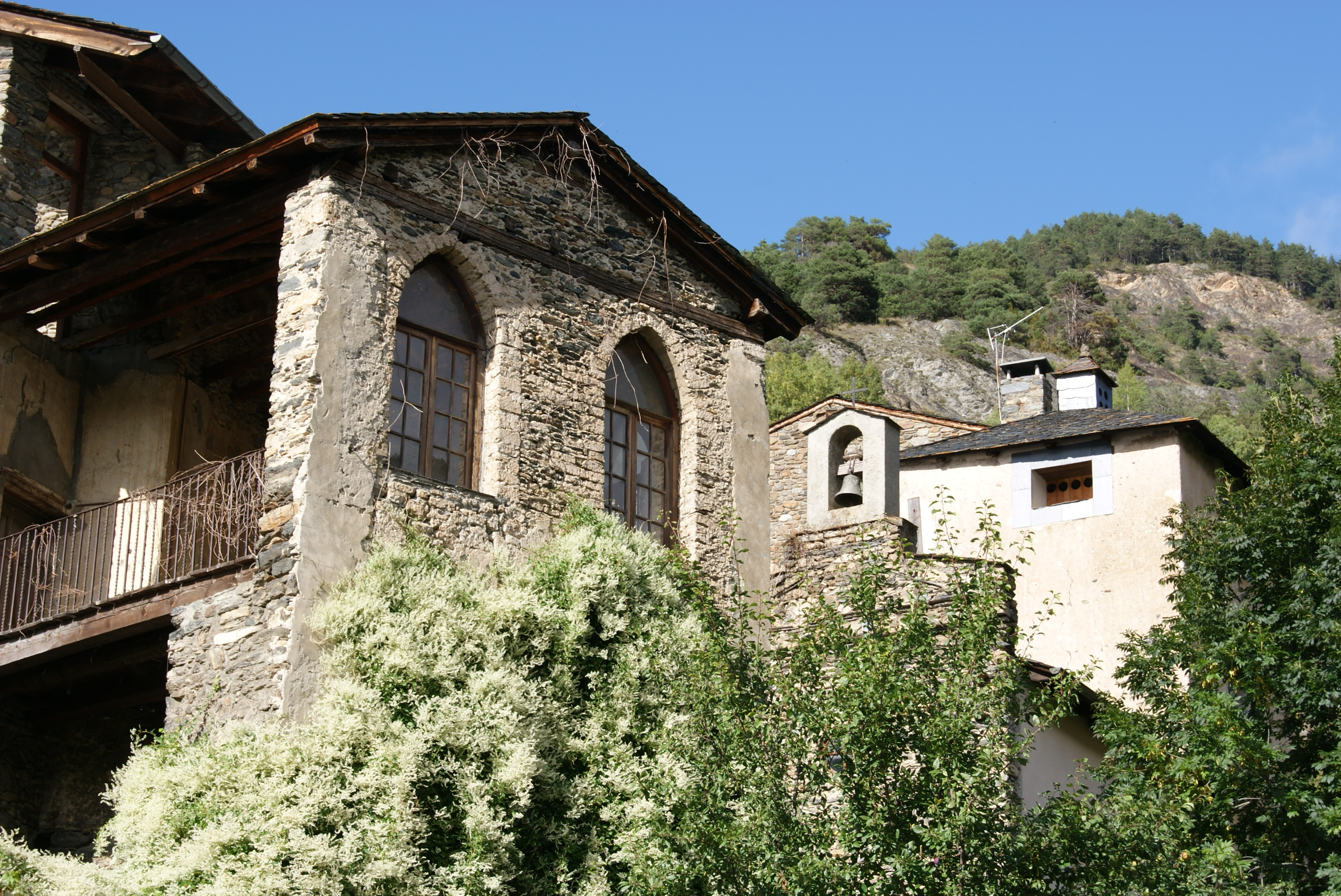
Casa Rossell

Casa Rossell is a manor house located in Ordino, Andorra. It is a heritage property registered in the Cultural Heritage of Andorra.
