= Casa d'Areny-Plandolit =

Historical mansion in Ordino, Andorra

Coordinates: 42°33′24″N 1°32′02″E

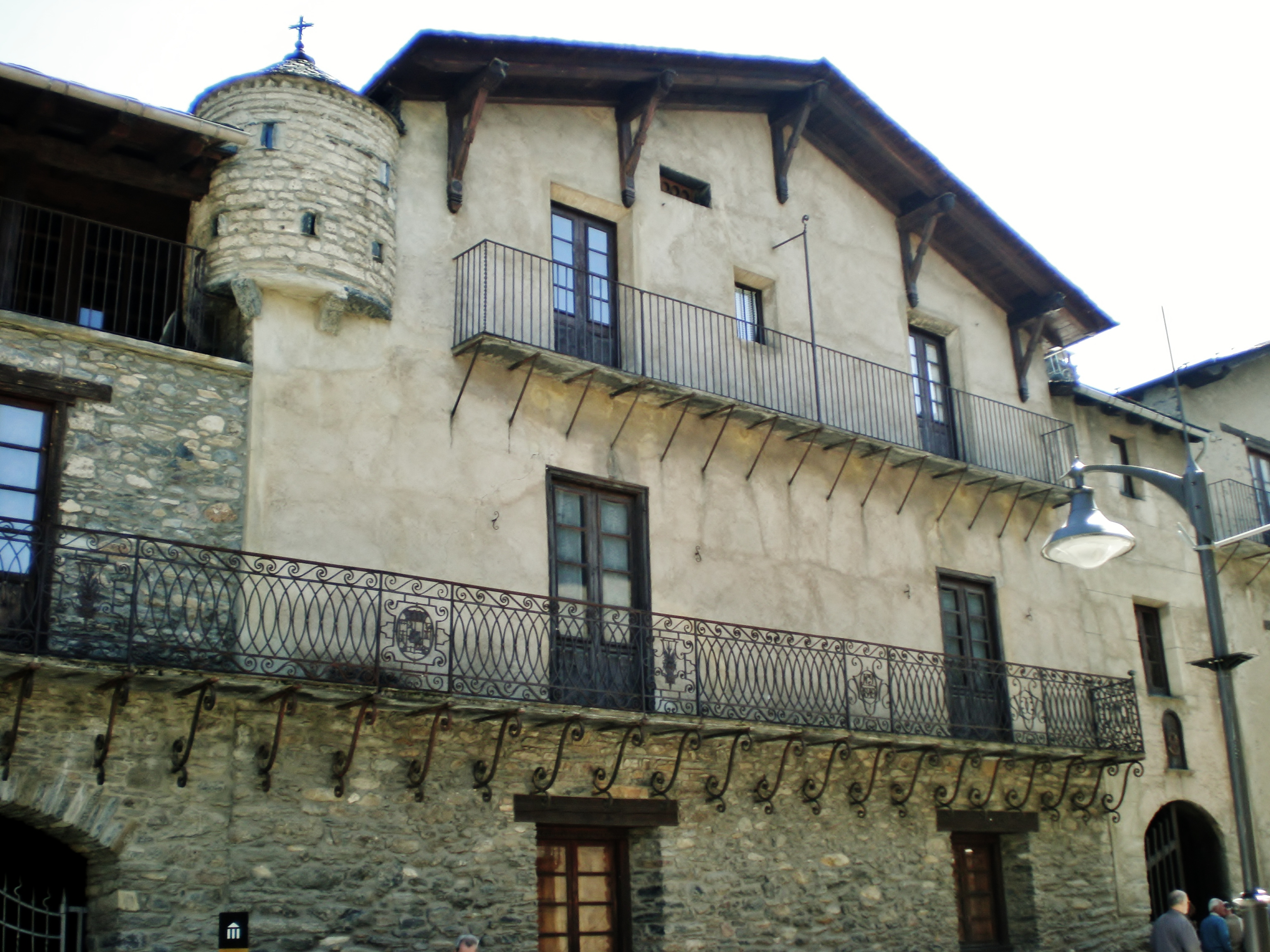
Casa d'Areny-Plandolit

Casa d'Areny-Plandolit is a historical mansion located in Ordino, Andorra. It is a heritage property registered in the Cultural Heritage of Andorra. It was built in 1633.

== See also ==
- Guillem d'Areny-Plandolit
- History of Andorra
