= Sornàs =

Village in Ordino, Andorra

- Location in Andorra
- Coordinates: 42°34′N 1°32′E
- Country: Andorra
- Parish: Ordino
- Elevation: 1,538 m (5,046 ft)

Population (2012)
  - Total: 251

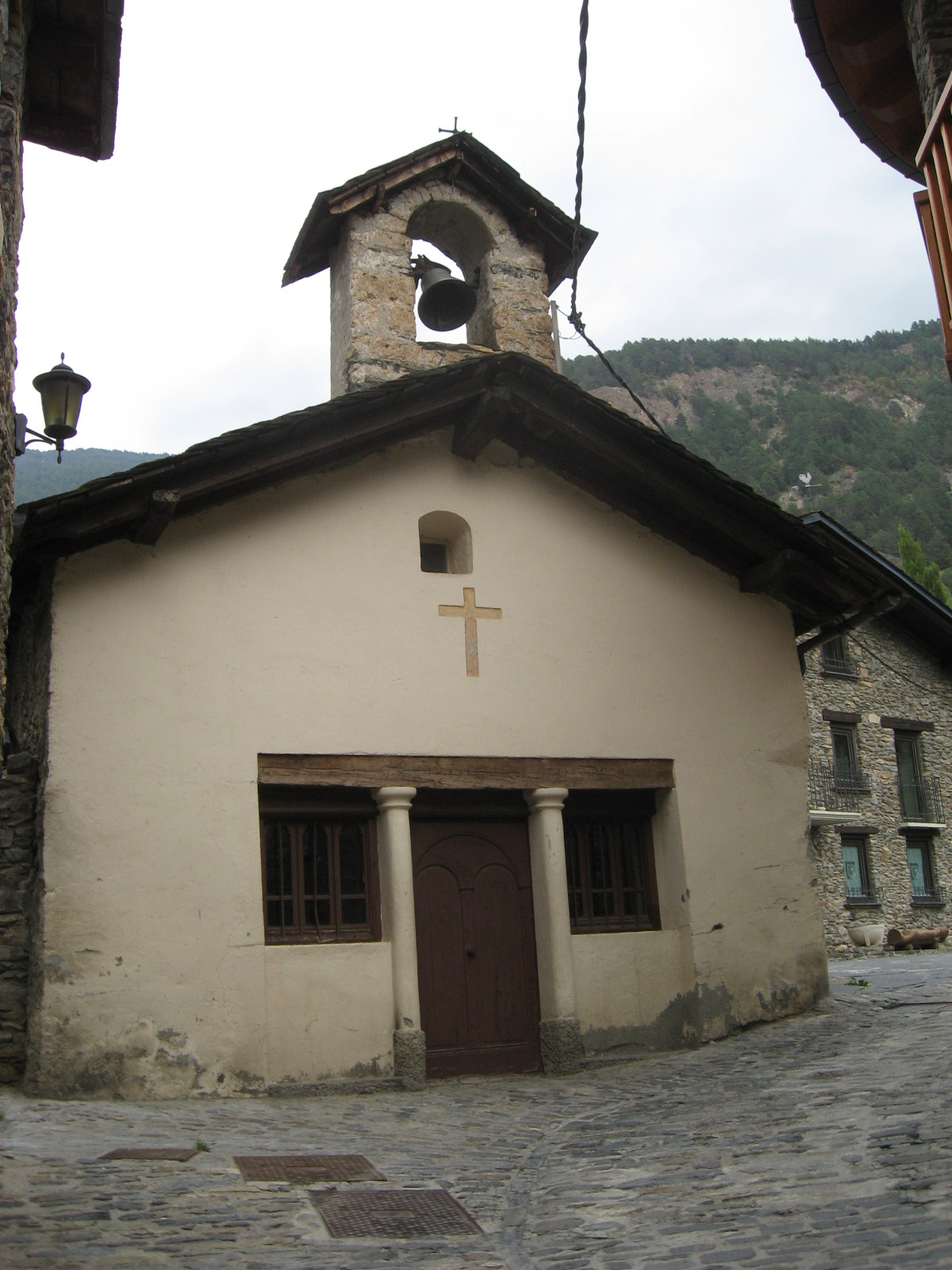
The Church of Sant Roc

Sornàs (Catalan pronunciation: [soɾˈnas]) is a village in Andorra, located in the parish of Ordino. Sornás is the first village along the 14 km of the main road 3, which connect Ordino with the Vallnord Ordino-Arcalís ski resort. The village, which due to its size and location looks more like an exclusive urbanization, had, in 2017, a population of 255 inhabitants, according to data from the Statistics Department of the Principality of Andorra.

The work “T'abraça”, which rests in the middle of the first roundabout when leaving Ordino, marks the detour to the village of Sornàs. The sculpture represents the union and friendship between people and, as one would expect in Andorra, is made with materials typical of the area (rock and wrought iron), mimicking better with the environment.

== Featured sites in Sornàs and the outskirts ==
- The Church of Sant Roc, located in the village square of Sornàs, is a small rural sacred building. It dates from the year 1730, with a rectangular floor plan, a bell-gable and a two-slope roof, it has a main facade and walls covered with lime mortar and cement, which give it a colorful white color as some of the oldest houses in Sornàs . Inside, a panel dedicated to Sant Roc presides over the altar.
- The sculptural work, made of skid-coated steel, by Didier Aleix and titled “Fent cap al coll” is a work dedicated to the refugees, a “tribute” to the Andorran ancestors who, in exile, made Andorra a welcoming land. The work, exposed at the base of the village, on one side of the main road, is formed by three characters walking in a row, a family led by the father, who is carrying a suitcase, the mother and, finally, the son, taking hands with the mother. It stands out for having participated in the Human Rights Road of the latest edition of the Land Art Biennial.
- For hiking lovers, Sornàs is part of various mountain routes of difficult levels. Among the highlights we find the path through which we can reach the neighboring village of La Cortinada, passing through the plains of Sornàs, where we can enjoy a pleasant walk and high views towards the valley and, on the other side, the path that takes us to the centre of Ordino, going through Segudet and with the option of branching off as far as the summit of Casamanya.
- The Sornàs stone engravings, also known as the Terra de Mola engravings, are a set of representations on stone made in an extensive period of time between pre-history and possibly the eighteenth century. Two equestrian figures form the cave art engraving while on the other side we can see the figure of a woman with a royal crown like those used in the eighteenth century. A scene with different characters is also documented, in what seems to be a ritual of human sacrifice. The engravings on stone were made using the technique of pecking.
- As part of the parish of Ordino, it is worth mentioning two of the most representative values of this parish and, if possible, also of the Principality of Andorra, such as the Ordino-Arcalis ski resort and the Natural Park from the Sorteny Valley. Two locations for different activities but with a clear focus on preserving the surroundings and the own identity that make them unique in their specialty.
