= Ordino =

Parish in northern Andorra

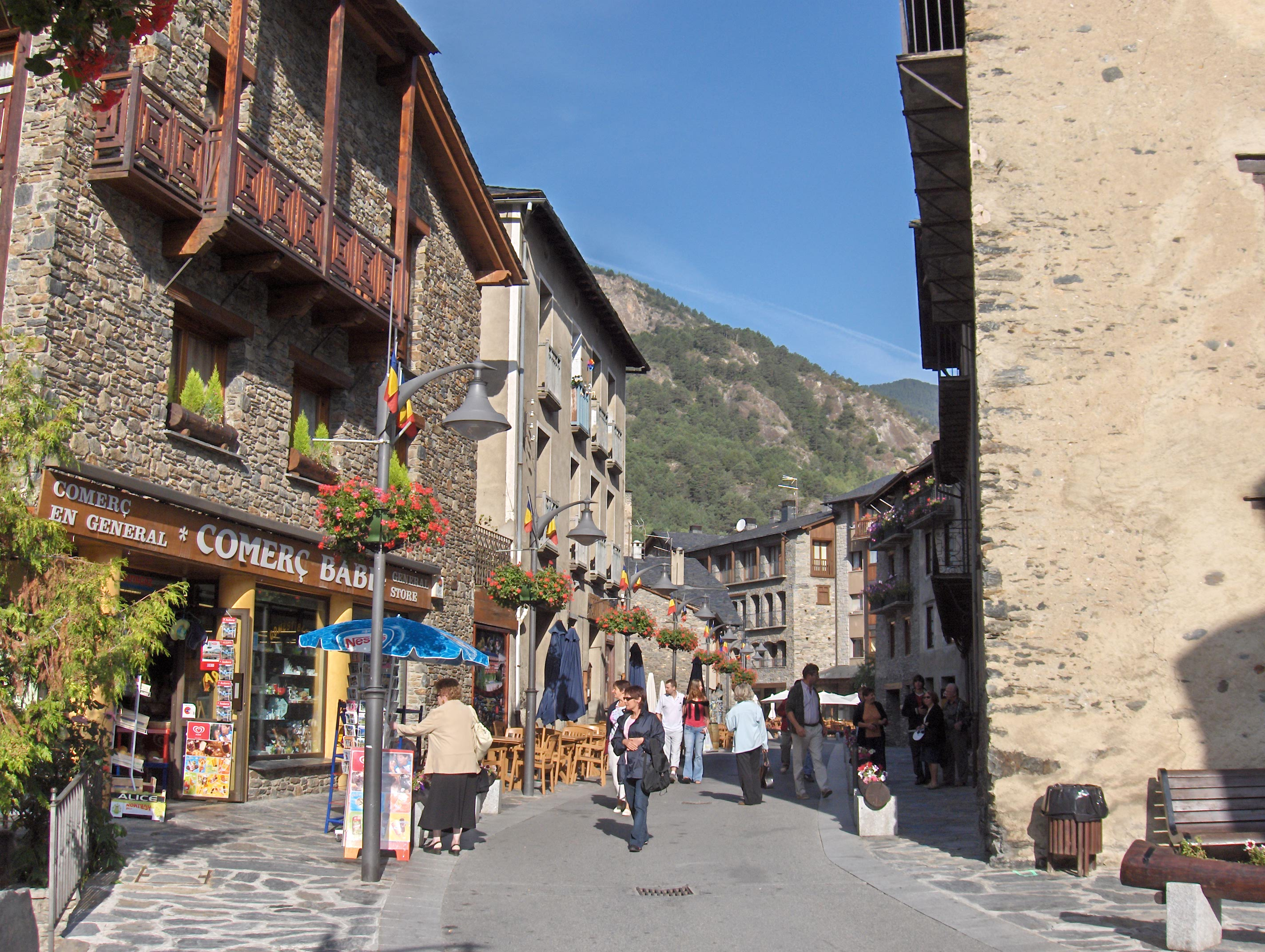
- Carrer Major and main street of Ordino town.

- Flag Coat of arms

- Location within Andorra
- Coordinates (Ordino town): 42°33′18″N 1°31′59″E
- Country: Andorra
- Parishes: Ordino
- Villages: Ansalonga, Arans, Arcalís, El Serrat, La Cortinada, Les Salines, Llorts, Segudet, Sornàs

Government
  - Mayor: Maria del Mar Coma (DA)

Area
  - Total: 85 km^{2} (33 sq mi)
- Elevation: 1,300 m (4,300 ft)

Population (2017)
  - Total: 4,858
  - Density: 57.15/km^{2} (148.0/sq mi)
- Demonym(s): Ordinenc, Ordinenca
- Postal code: AD300
- Website: Official site

Ordino (Catalan pronunciation: [oɾˈðino]) is the most northerly parish in the Principality of Andorra. It's mostly the main area of Valira del Nord or Valira d'Ordino river valley. Ordino is also the name of the main town of the parish. Other settlements in the parish are El Serrat, Ansalonga, Sornàs, La Cortinada, Llorts, Segudet, Arans, Les Salines and Arcalís. It is home to the Sorteny National Park, the largest nature area of Andorra. It has a population of 4,858, as of 2017. The town preserves a vast medieval center, mainly linked to the culture of the country.

Ordino is a Biosphere Reserve by UNESCO since 2020 and has been recognized in 2023 as Best Tourism Village by UN Tourism.

== Geography ==
The parish has borders with France (Occitania) and also with the parishes of La Massana, Canillo, and Encamp. The only main road and only all year external link is the CG-3 leading to the neighbouring parish of La Massana. With 85 km^{2} is the third largest parish after Canillo and Encamp.

The town of Ordino lies on the footslopes of Casamanya (2740 m), a mountain which has spectacular panoramic views from its summit being located almost exactly in the centre of Andorra.

=== Climate ===
Ordino has an oceanic climate (Köppen climate classification Cfb). The average annual temperature in Ordino is 8.0 °C (46.4 °F). The average annual rainfall is 942.4 mm (37.10 in) with May as the wettest month. The temperatures are highest on average in July, at around 15.9 °C (60.6 °F), and lowest in January, at around 1.5 °C (34.7 °F). The highest temperature ever recorded in Ordino was 32.9 °C (91.2 °F) on 18 August 2012; the coldest temperature ever recorded was −18.9 °C (−2.0 °F) on 23 February 2005.

Climate data for Ordino (1981–2010 averages, extremes 1999−2019)
Month	Jan	Feb	Mar	Apr	May	Jun	Jul	Aug	Sep	Oct	Nov	Dec	Year
Record high °C (°F)	18.5 (65.3)	19.2 (66.6)	21.5 (70.7)	24.8 (76.6)	28.3 (82.9)	30.2 (86.4)	32.0 (89.6)	32.9 (91.2)	31.0 (87.8)	27.1 (80.8)	21.3 (70.3)	17.1 (62.8)	32.9 (91.2)
Mean daily maximum °C (°F)	6.8 (44.2)	7.3 (45.1)	9.8 (49.6)	11.6 (52.9)	16.1 (61.0)	21.3 (70.3)	23.4 (74.1)	23.1 (73.6)	19.5 (67.1)	14.9 (58.8)	9.1 (48.4)	6.7 (44.1)	14.2 (57.6)
Daily mean °C (°F)	1.5 (34.7)	1.7 (35.1)	3.9 (39.0)	6.0 (42.8)	9.8 (49.6)	13.9 (57.0)	15.9 (60.6)	15.6 (60.1)	12.5 (54.5)	9.1 (48.4)	3.8 (38.8)	1.6 (34.9)	8.0 (46.4)
Mean daily minimum °C (°F)	−3.9 (25.0)	−3.8 (25.2)	−2.0 (28.4)	0.5 (32.9)	3.6 (38.5)	6.5 (43.7)	8.3 (46.9)	8.1 (46.6)	5.5 (41.9)	3.0 (37.4)	−1.4 (29.5)	−3.6 (25.5)	1.8 (35.2)
Record low °C (°F)	−16.6 (2.1)	−18.9 (−2.0)	−16.6 (2.1)	−7.1 (19.2)	−3.9 (25.0)	−0.7 (30.7)	−0.6 (30.9)	0.3 (32.5)	−4.2 (24.4)	−7.0 (19.4)	−14.1 (6.6)	−14.5 (5.9)	−18.9 (−2.0)
Average precipitation mm (inches)	59.3 (2.33)	51.6 (2.03)	72.8 (2.87)	101.0 (3.98)	109.6 (4.31)	101.5 (4.00)	75.6 (2.98)	75.0 (2.95)	74.0 (2.91)	86.3 (3.40)	86.0 (3.39)	49.7 (1.96)	942.4 (37.10)
Average precipitation days (≥ 1.0 mm)	8.1	7.7	9.7	12.2	14.0	9.0	8.0	8.3	8.3	10.1	9.8	7.0	112.2
Source: Météo France

== History ==
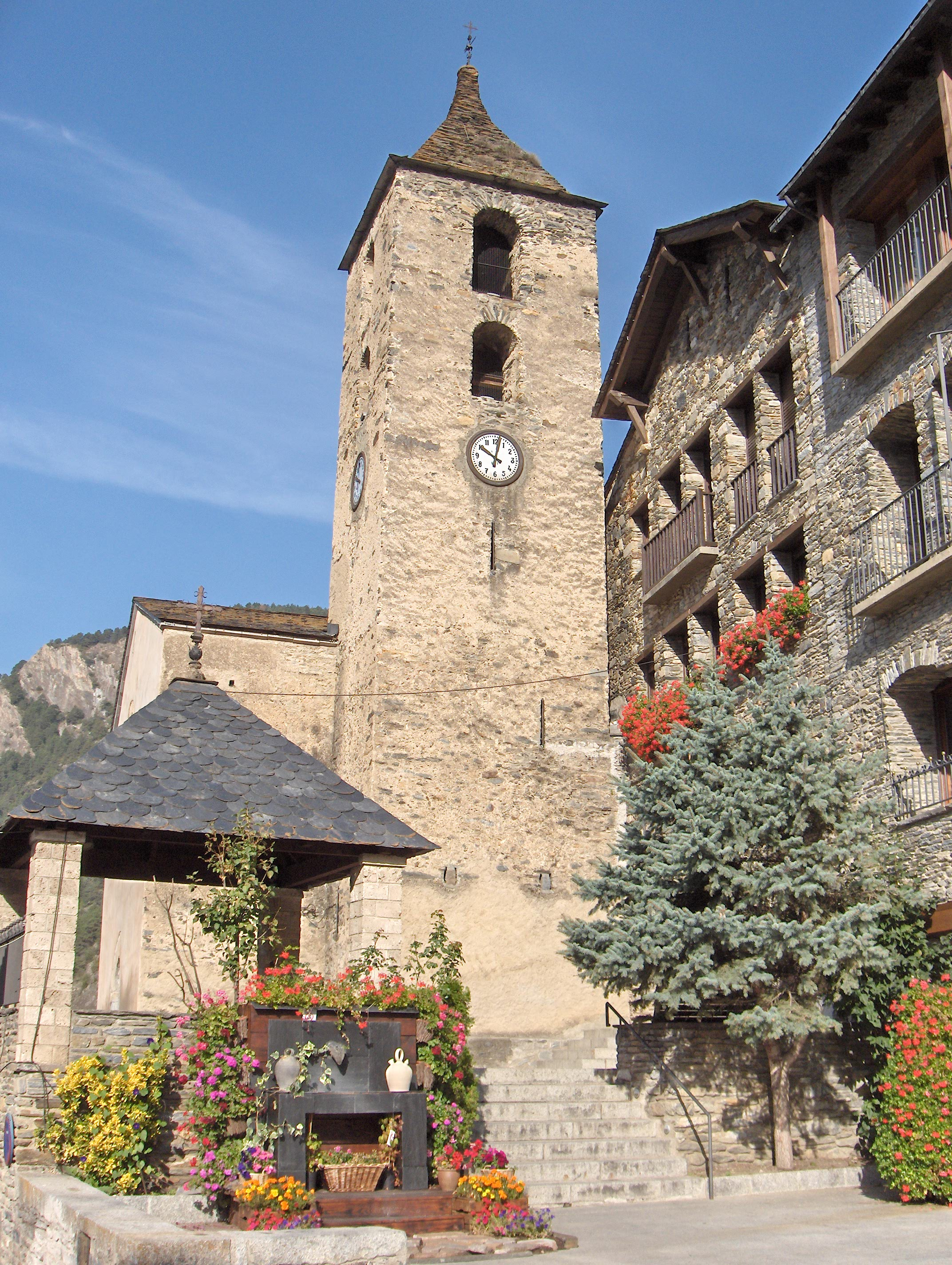
The 12th century Romanesque Sant Corneli and Sant Cebrià church and bell tower in Ordino.

The etymological origin of the name of the parish Ordino and its capital is pre-Roman, and it is documented for the first time in the Acta de Consagració i Dotació de la Catedral de la Seu d'Urgell (Deed of Consecration and Endowment of the Cathedral of La Seu d'Urgell), during the 9th century, as Hordinavi or Sant Cebrià d'Hordinavi.

Ordino is historically known for its ironworks of the 16th century, especially Farga del Serrat and Farga de l'Areny. Besides being the industrial center of Andorra, Ordino is considered the cultural center of Andorra. Here Antoni Fiter i Rossell wrote the Manual Digest (1748), called the "Bible of Andorra," which tells the story, the government and the Andorran customs.

The town of Ordino include the parish church of Sant Corneli i Sant Cebrià, already mentioned in 839, was mainly built during the 12th and 13th centuries. The Romanesque church of Sant Martí de la Cortinada, with 12th-century murals, is also a good example of romanesque Andorran art.

Manor houses like Fiter-Riba or Casa Rossell, which holds the original Manual Digest and Areny-Plandolit family house, owners of Farga de l'Areny, represented the good society of Andorra between the 17th and 19th centuries. Both mansions were acquired in 1972 by Consell General and converted into an ethnological and historical museum.

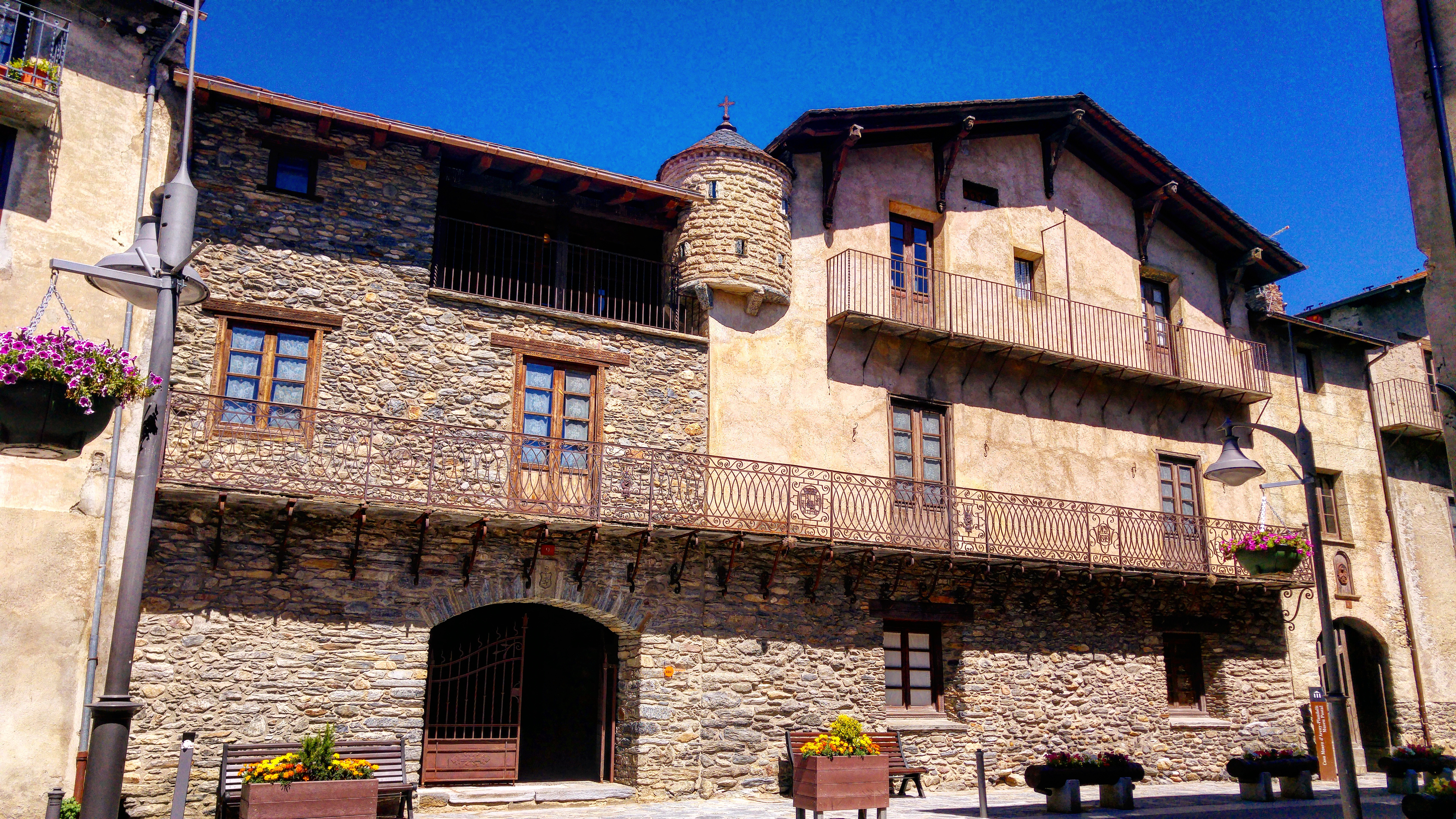
Areny-Plandolit family house localed in Carrer Major d'Ordino.

The parish and town is the namesake of the Andorran legend El buner d'Ordino, in which a bagpiper from Ordino, en route to a festival in Canillo, is chased and treed by wolves, but frightens them off by playing his instrument.

== Culture ==
Ordino has been part of the culture of Andorra and the Catalan language as major headquarter of Fundacio Ramon Llull (Ramon Llull Foundation), an international organization constituted in 2008 in order to promote Catalan language and culture internationally.

The National Auditorium of Andorra (Catalan: Auditori Nacional d'Andorra) is located in Ordino town. The International Narciso Yepes Festival, a series of classical music concerts, has been held there every October since 1983. The festival was started by the late guitarist, Narciso Yepes.

The Postal and Postcard Museum of Andorra (Catalan: Museu Postal d'Andorra) and the Miniature Museum (Catalan: Museu de la Miniatura) are localed in the parish of Ordino.

La Ruta del Ferro, which translates into English as the Iron Route, is a cultural route of old iron ore mines and rural cottages across the Valira del Nord, between Llorts and La Cortinada. It is part of the old road that the carriers used to carry the iron from the mines of Llorts to the ironwork forges of La Massana.

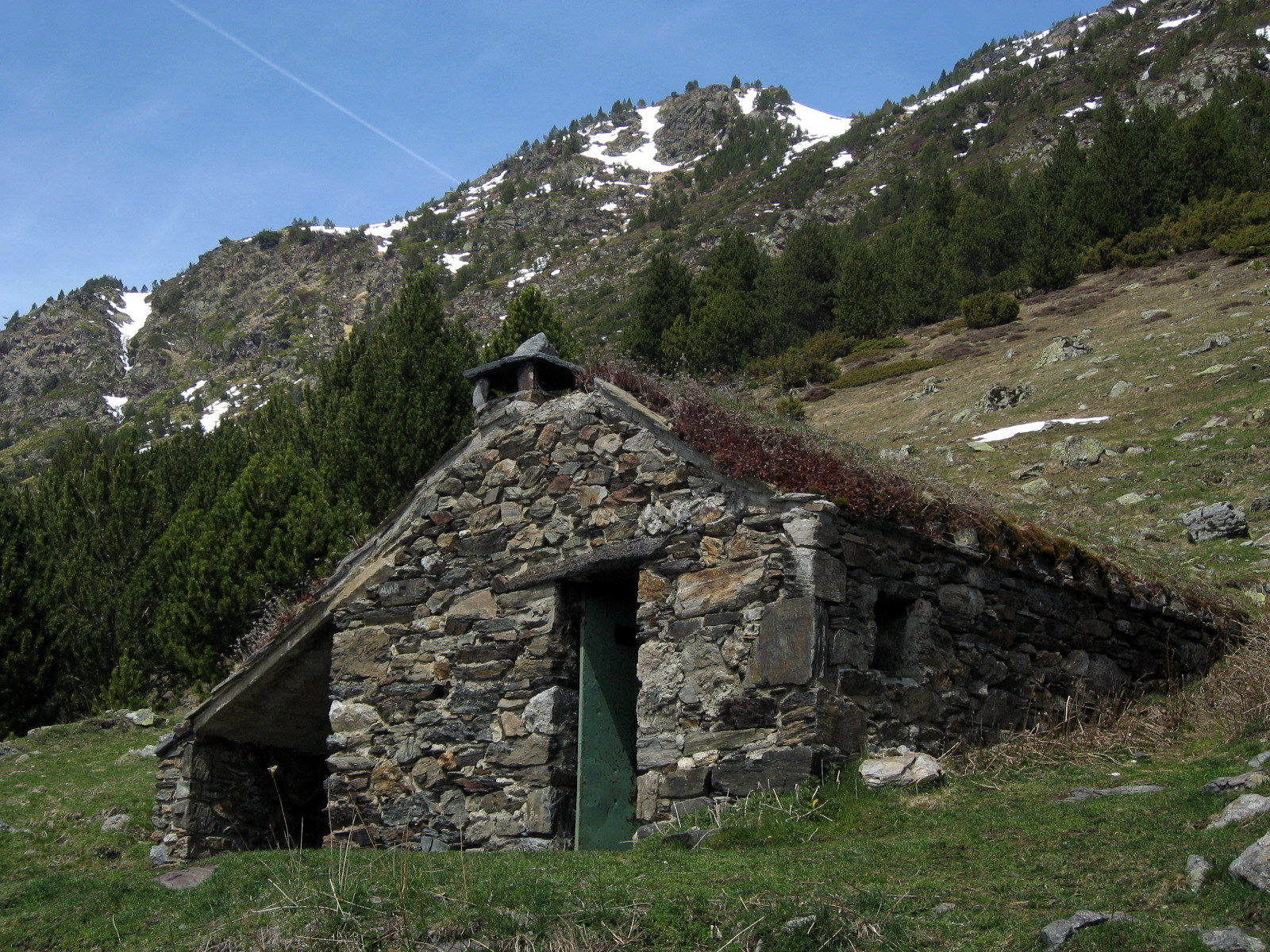
Mountain cabin in Pleta del Castellar, Arcalís.

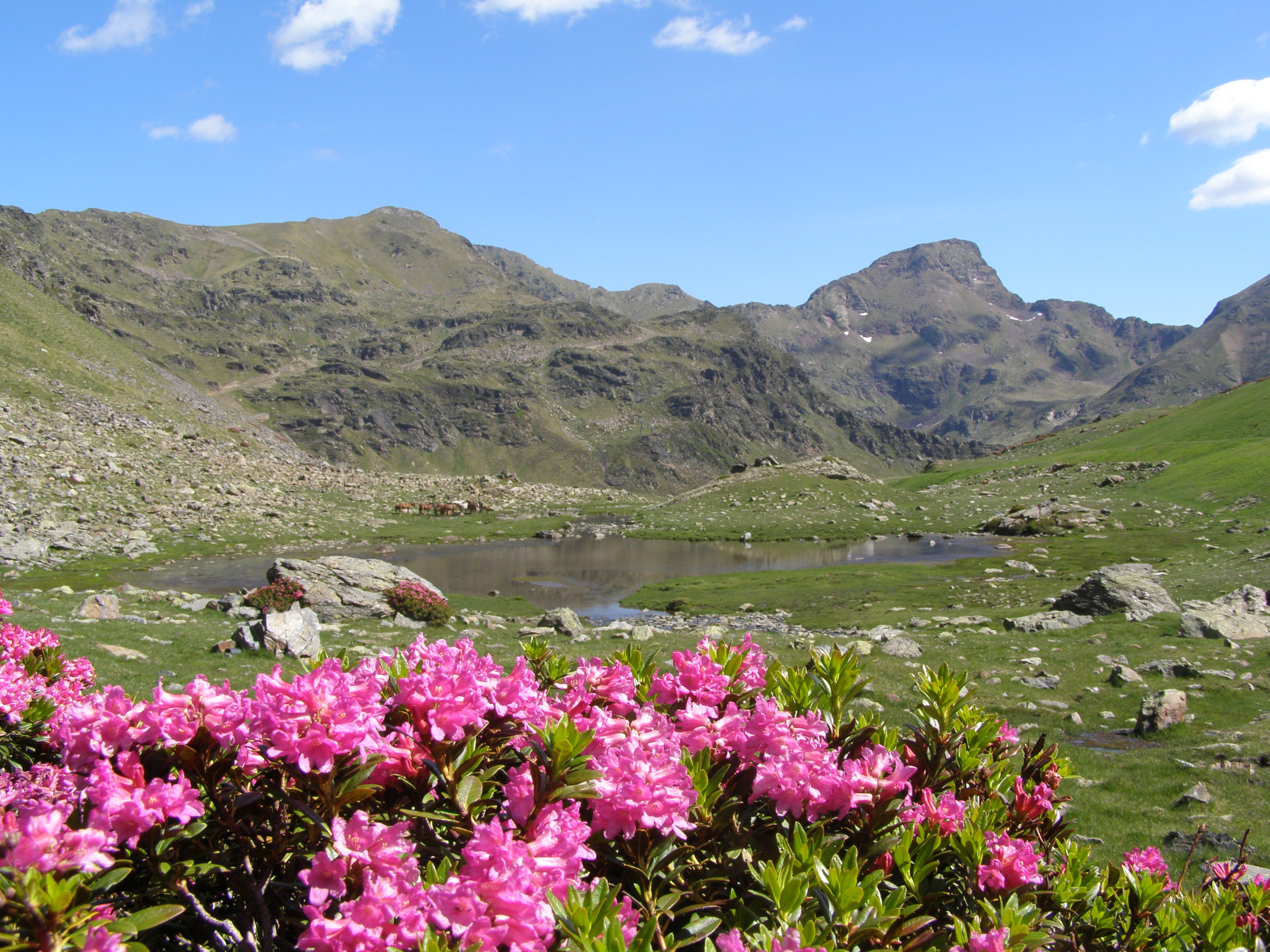
View from Tristaina lakes of La Coma d'Ordino and Arcalís.

=== Events and festivities ===
A festival deeply rooted in the town of Ordino is El Roser d'Ordino or The Rose Festival, in which the processions and devotions during the month of July have given way to the Roses festival, a spring symbol linked to love, beauty and devotion. Traditionally, the day before the youth went to pick roses that grew in the fields and orchards, preparing the bouquets and placed in a basket that gave to women. The celebration was religious in the morning, in the afternoon there was a parade and a harvest (La Plega del Carbassó) and everything ended with a dance at night.

During two days, usually the first weekend of August, the streets of Ordino are filled with buners, an aerophone instrument that receives a wide variety of names depending on the area (bag of moans, xeremia, coixinera, Ordino's bagpipe, bottle or cleat) and is a symbol of the parish by its legend. All events are popular, celebrated by local people and parishioners, who have gone from town to town and from a popular festival to a popular festival playing the bagpipes.

The sings of Caramelles (religious songs from the Old Catalonia sung during the Easter), and its dances, are also popular and traditional in the parish.

== Sports ==
The Comú d'Ordino, the local government, has a sports center (CEO) with swimming pool, gym, squash, sauna and rock climbing wall; along with the CTEO sport center with indoor and outdoor fields. It's also the parish were the start and finish of Ultra Trail Andorra take place, one of the most important mountain trail races in Southern Europe.

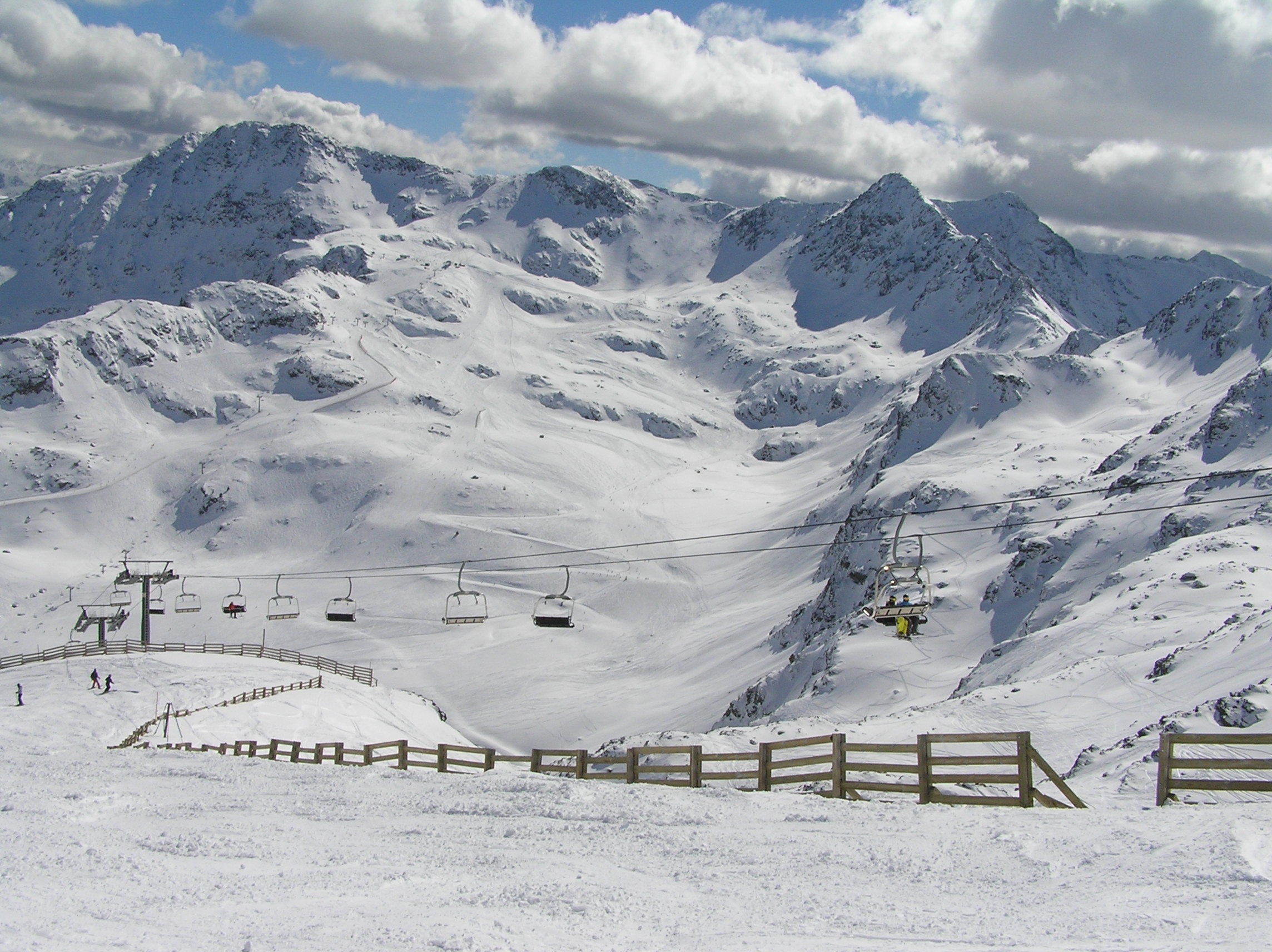
View from top of chairlift to Cota (2625m) overlooking La Coma part of the Arcalís ski resort.

FC Ordino, founded in 2010, is one of the major sport clubs in the parish. The club's football section currently plays in Primera Divisió, the Andorran Premier Division.

In the extreme northwest of the parish is the Vallnord (Ordino-Arcalis sector ski station) ski resort which has peaks up to 2,625 m.

Vallnord is part of the annually Freeride World Tour El Dorado route since 2015, as part of the major ski events in Andorra; along with the FIS International Youth Trophy Trofeu Borrufa celebrated every January. The ski station has also hosted since 2005 main stages of the European Championships of Ski Mountaineering and World Championships of Ski Mountaineering.

During summer the ski resort is open as bike park. In mountain biking, Vallnord was the venue for events during the 2008, 2009 and 2013 UCI Mountain Bike World Cup. The 2015 UCI Mountain Bike & Trials World Championships were held in Vallnord.

In road cycling, Arcalis was used for a stage finish in the 1994 Vuelta a España, and Pal as a stage finish in the 2010 Vuelta a España. Vallnord was used for stage finishes in the 2007, 2009 and 2011 Volta a Catalunya. Stage 10 of the 1997 Tour de France, Stage 7 of the 2009 Tour de France and Stage 9 of the 2016 Tour de France also all finished at Arcalis.

The major national road bicycle touring event, La Volta als Ports, finish in Arcalís. The race, also known as the Tour of the Andorran Passes or the Andorran Vuelta, was developed during the mid-1970s and has become one of the largest cyclotourism road event in Southern Europe.

== Environment ==
As of October 2020, Ordino is part of the UNESCO's World Network of Biosphere Reserves.

== Gallery ==
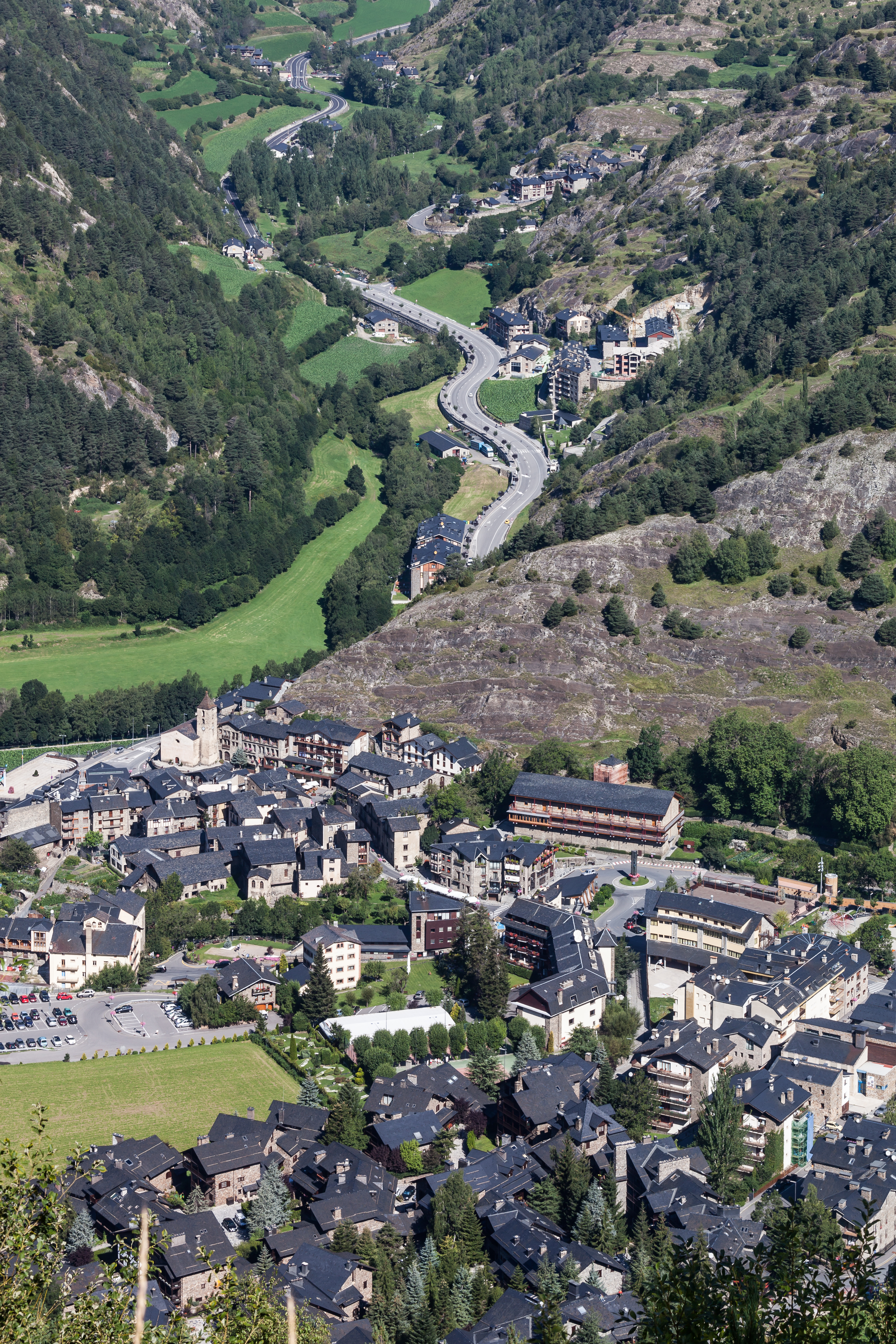
Ordino and road to La Massana

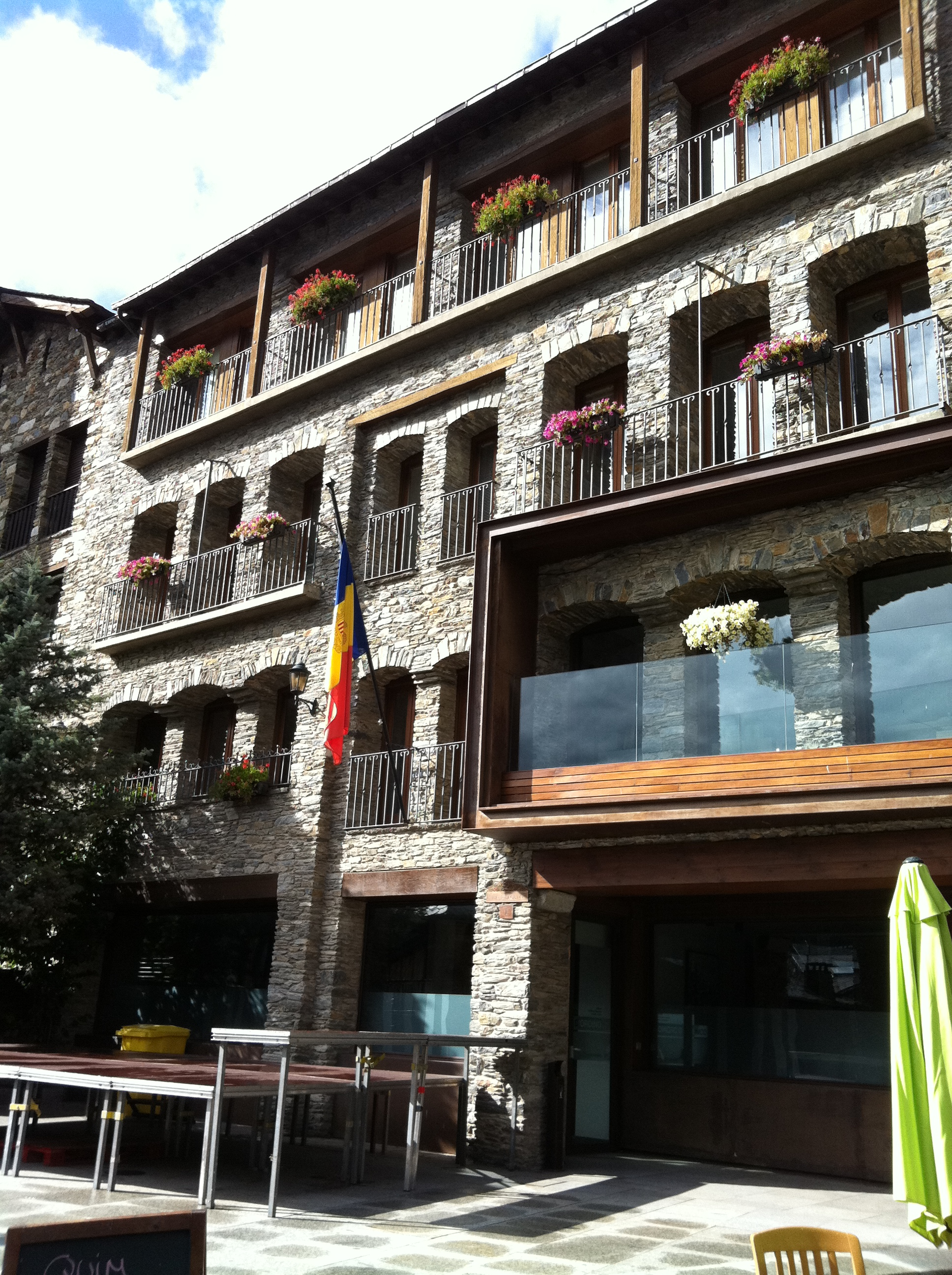
Ordino Town Hall

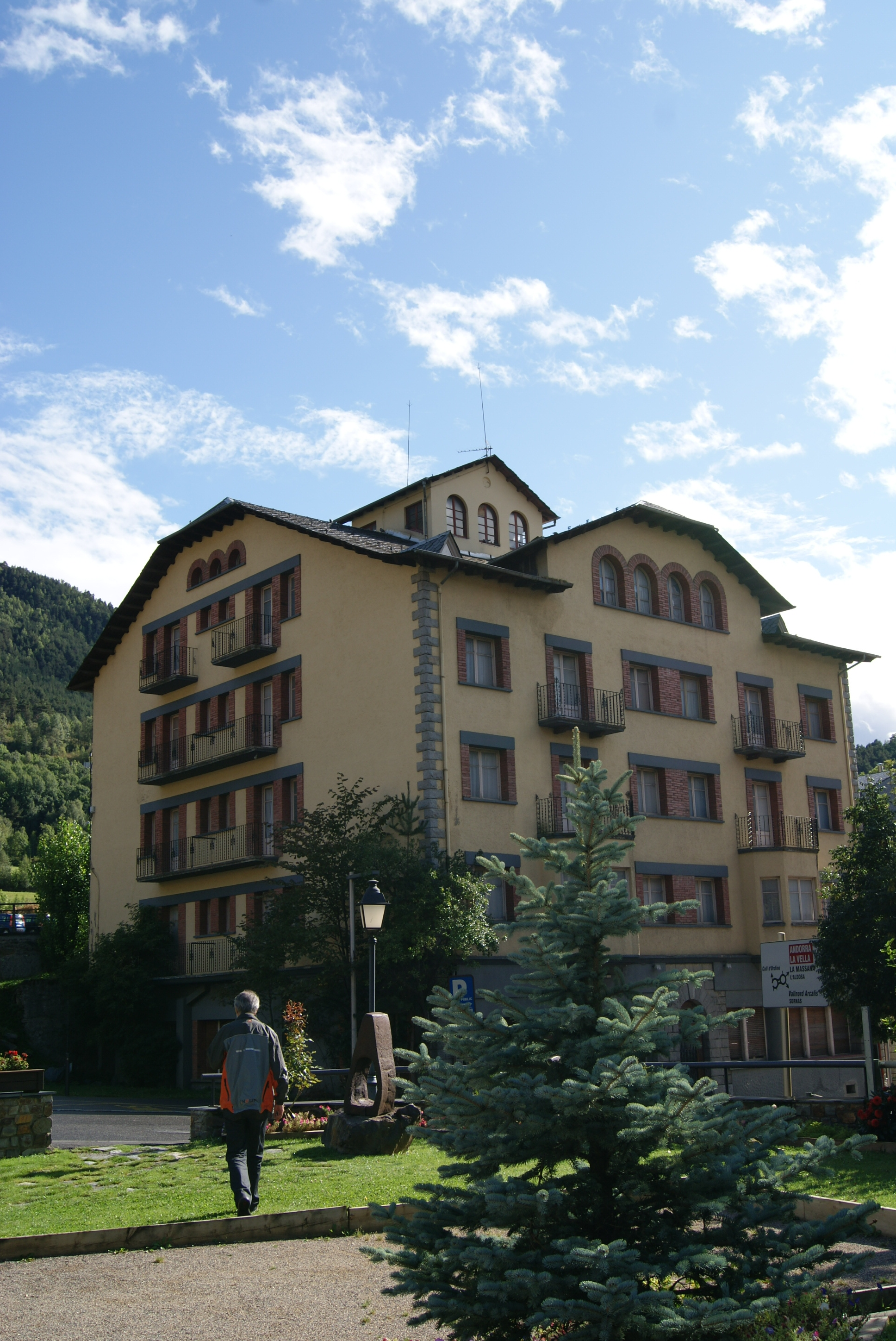
Noucentist Hotel Casamanya

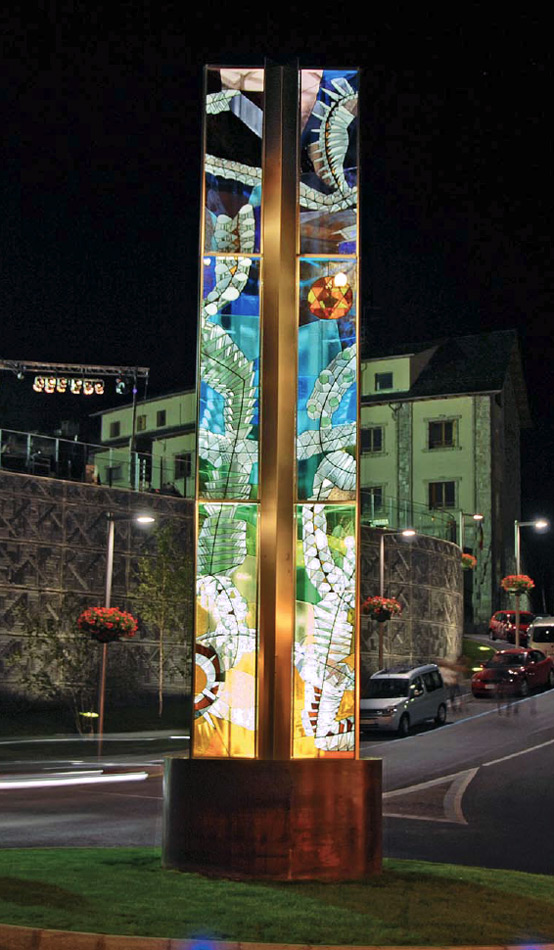
National Auditorium Square by Domènec Fita i Molat

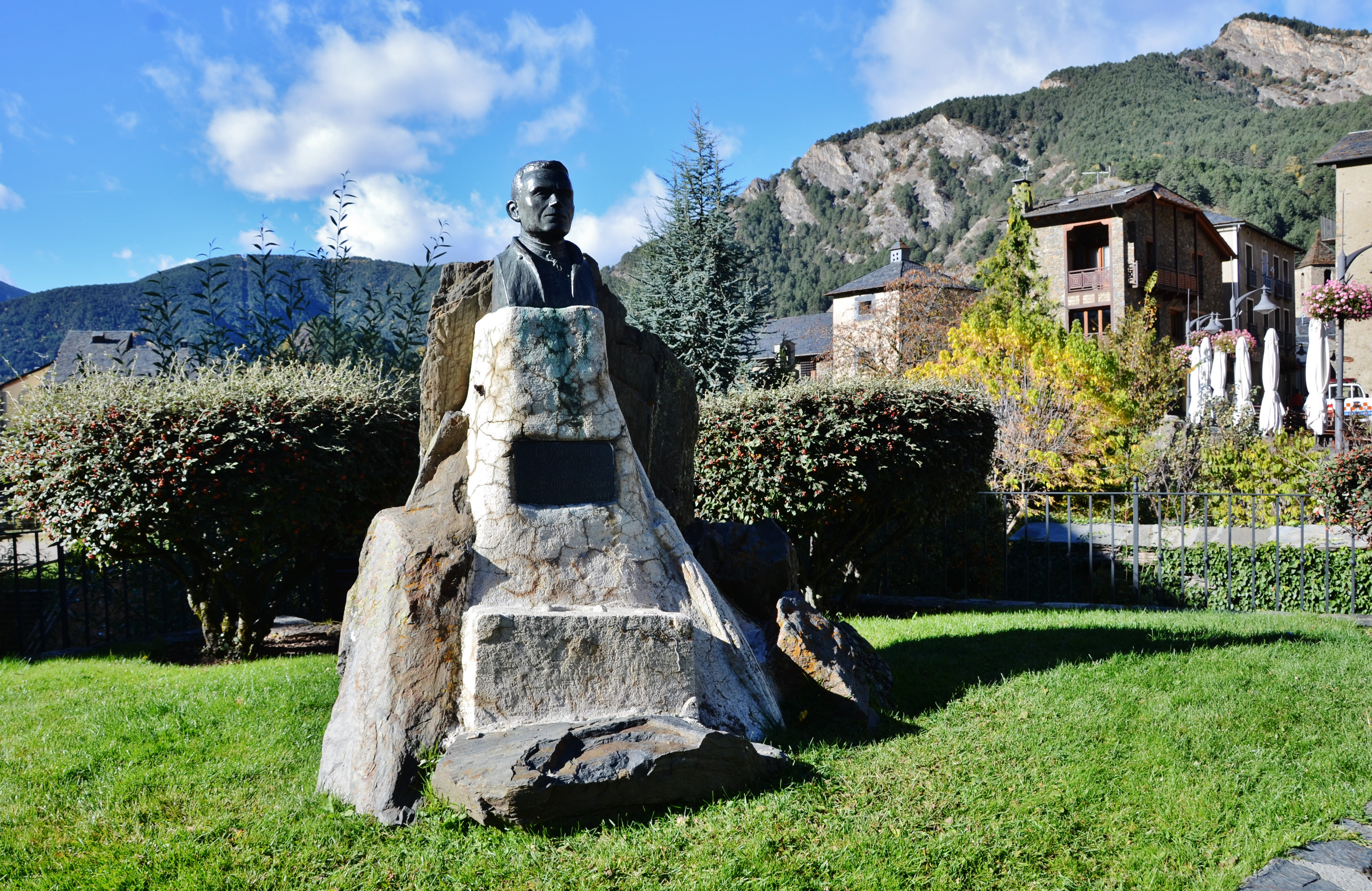
Jacint Verdaguer statue

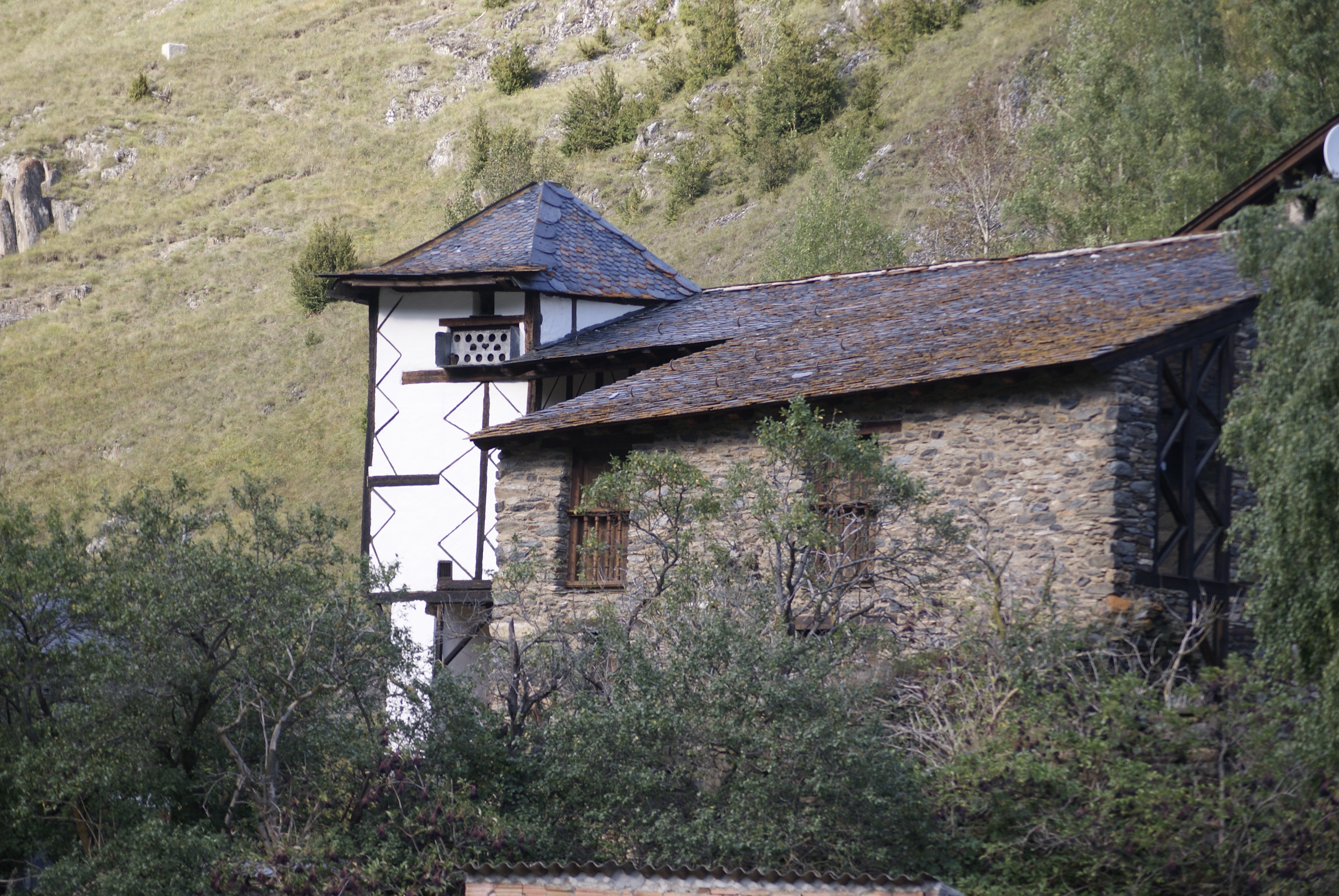
Cal Pal de la Cortinada

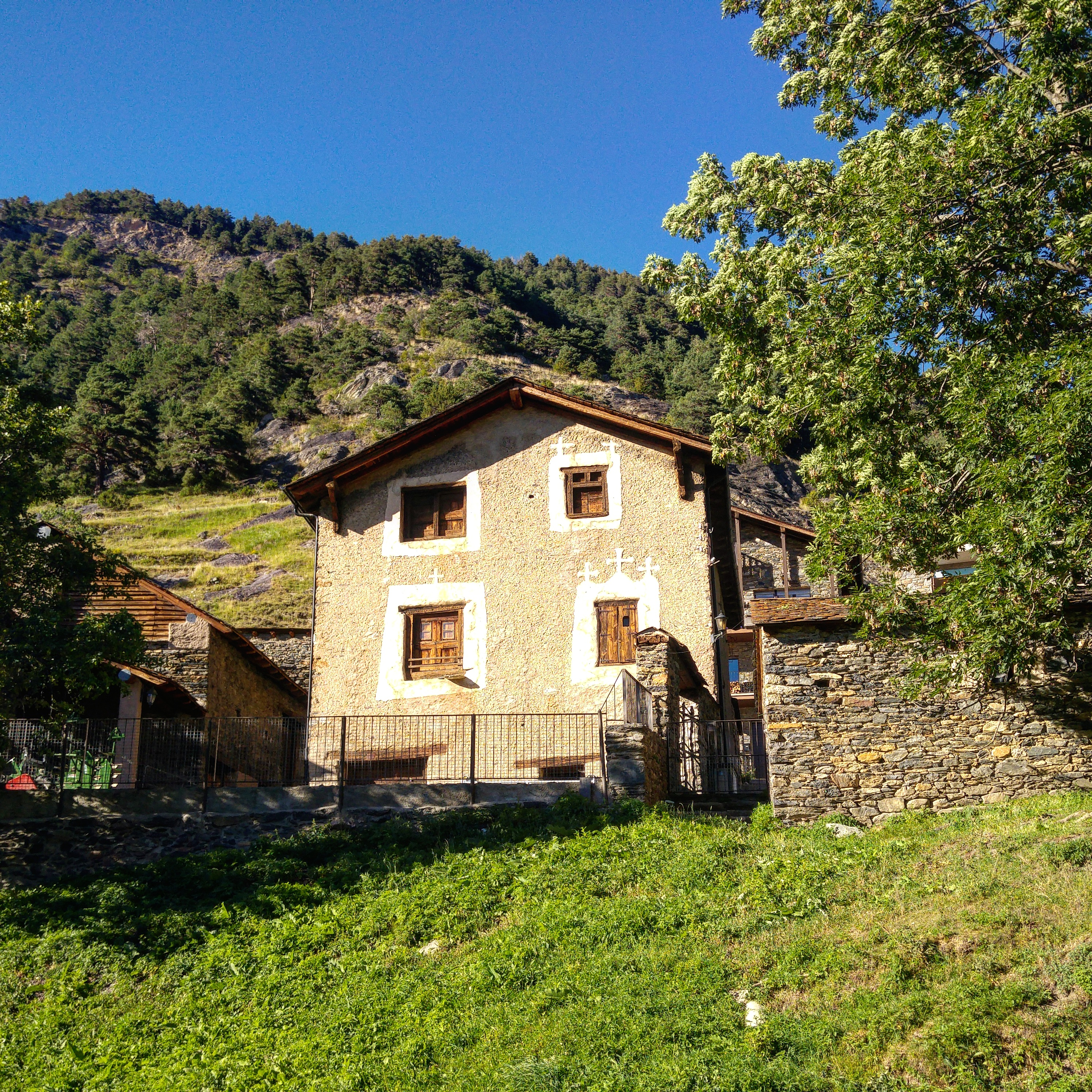
Casa Blanca de Segudet

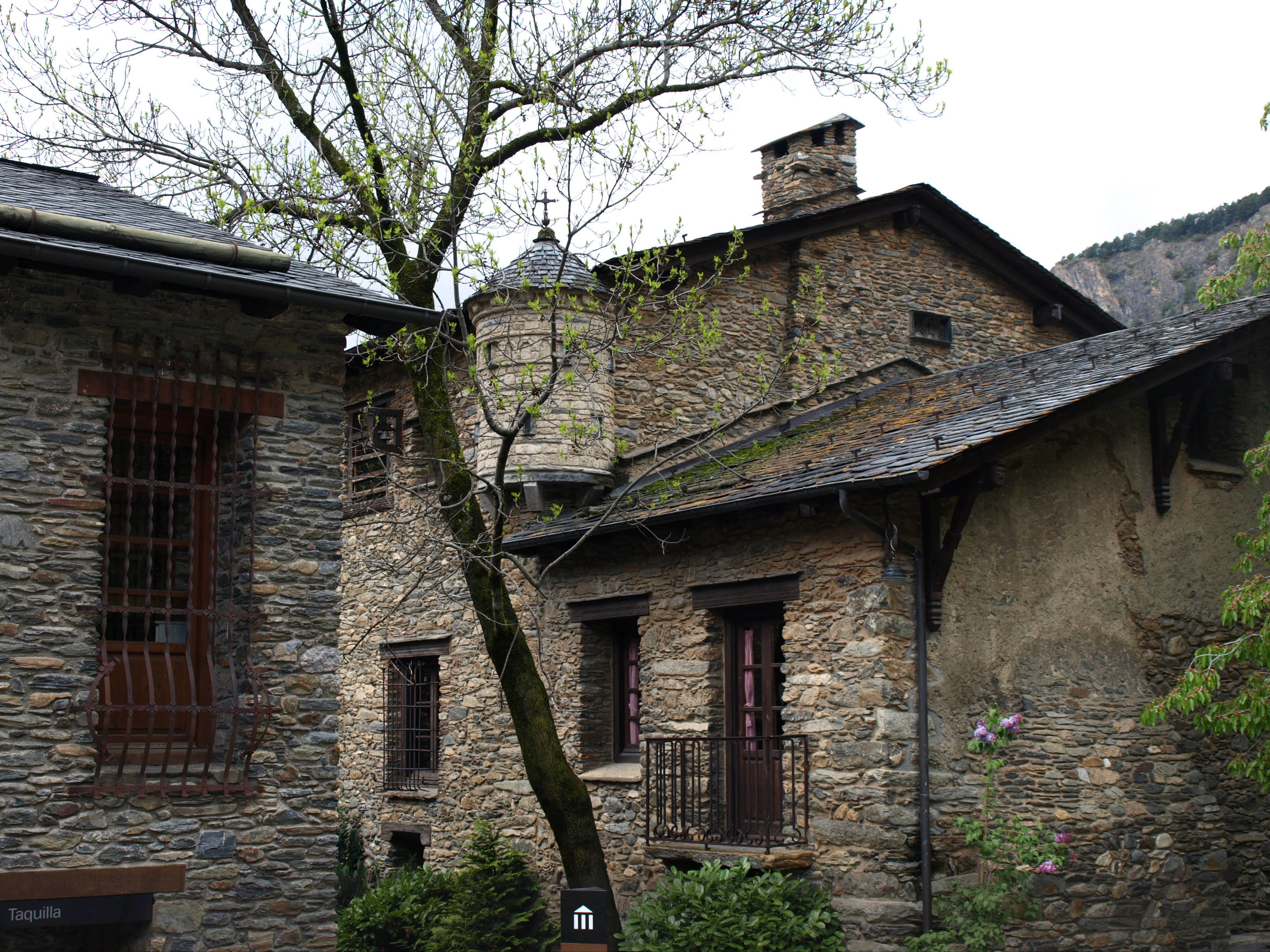
Areny-Plandolit Manor House

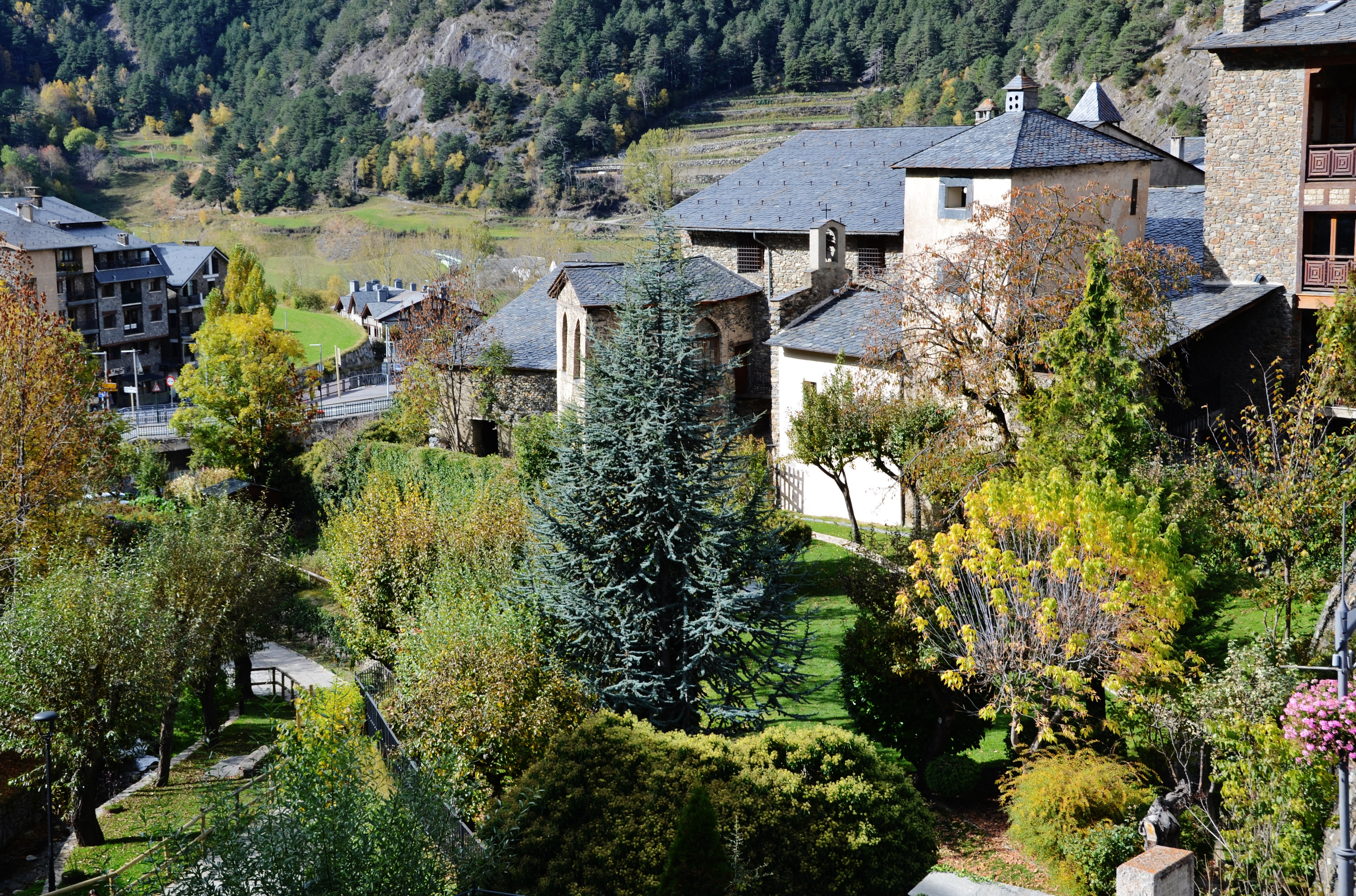
Casa Rossell

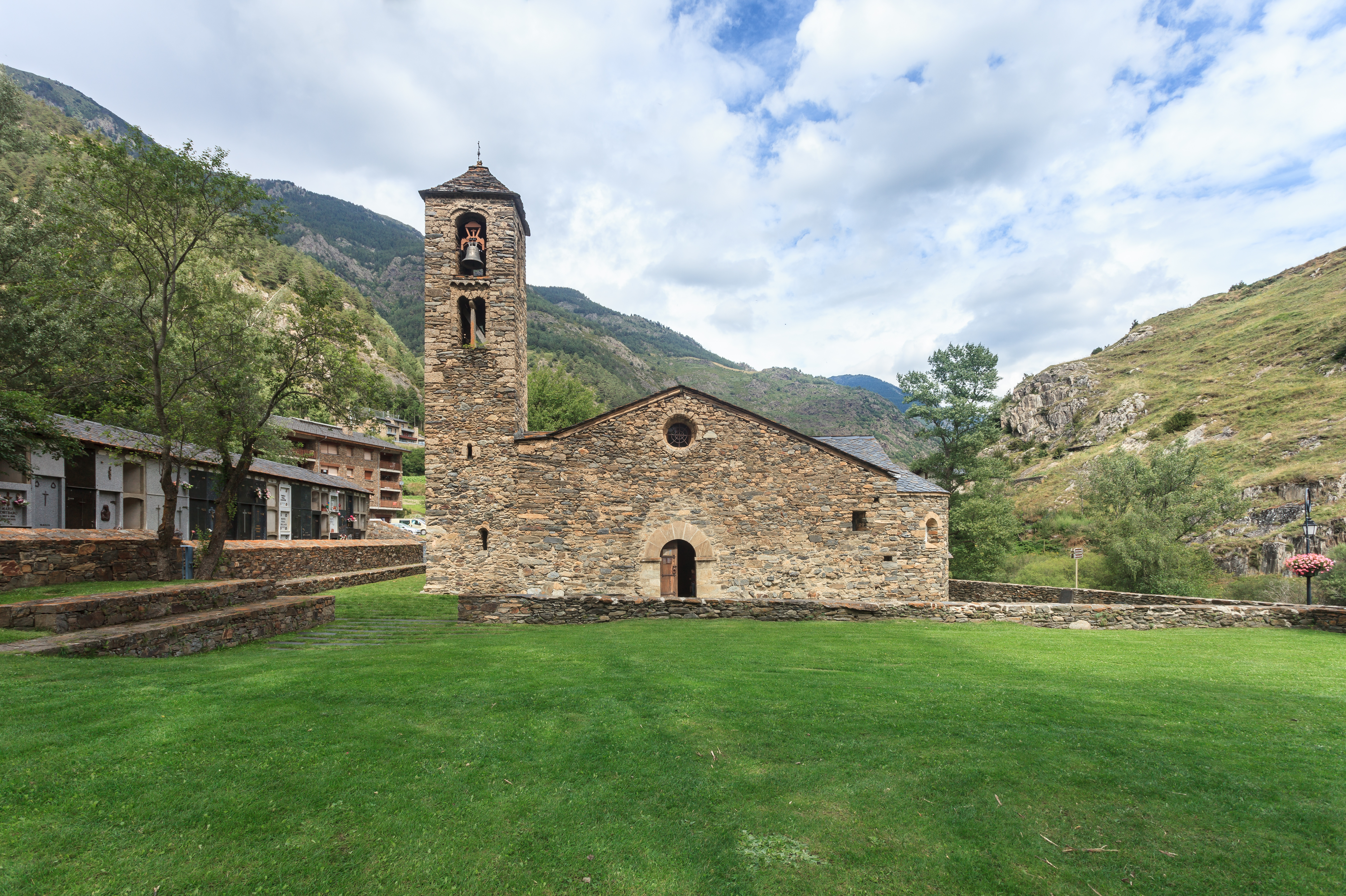
Església de Sant Martí de la Cortinada

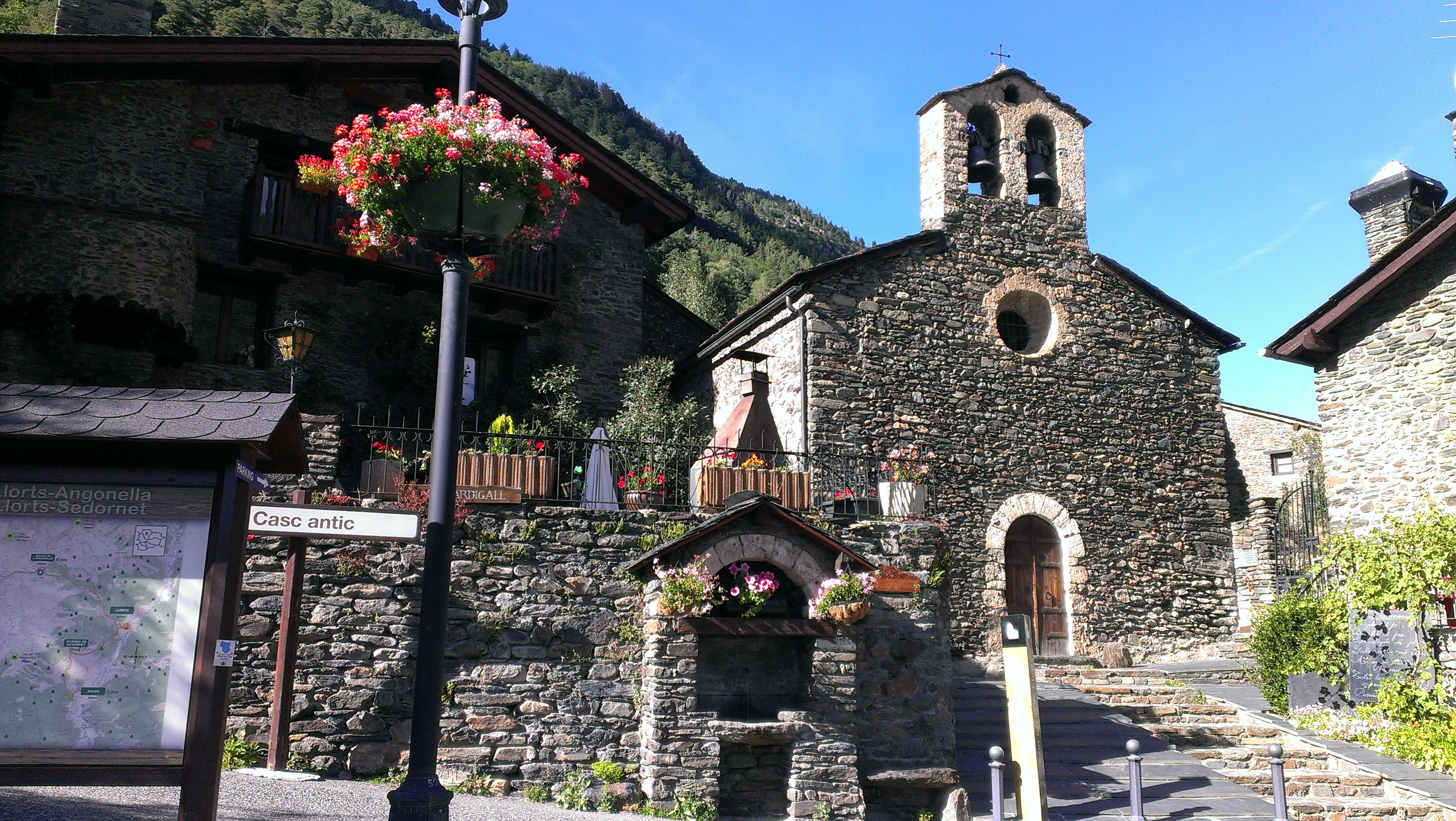
Old town of Llorts

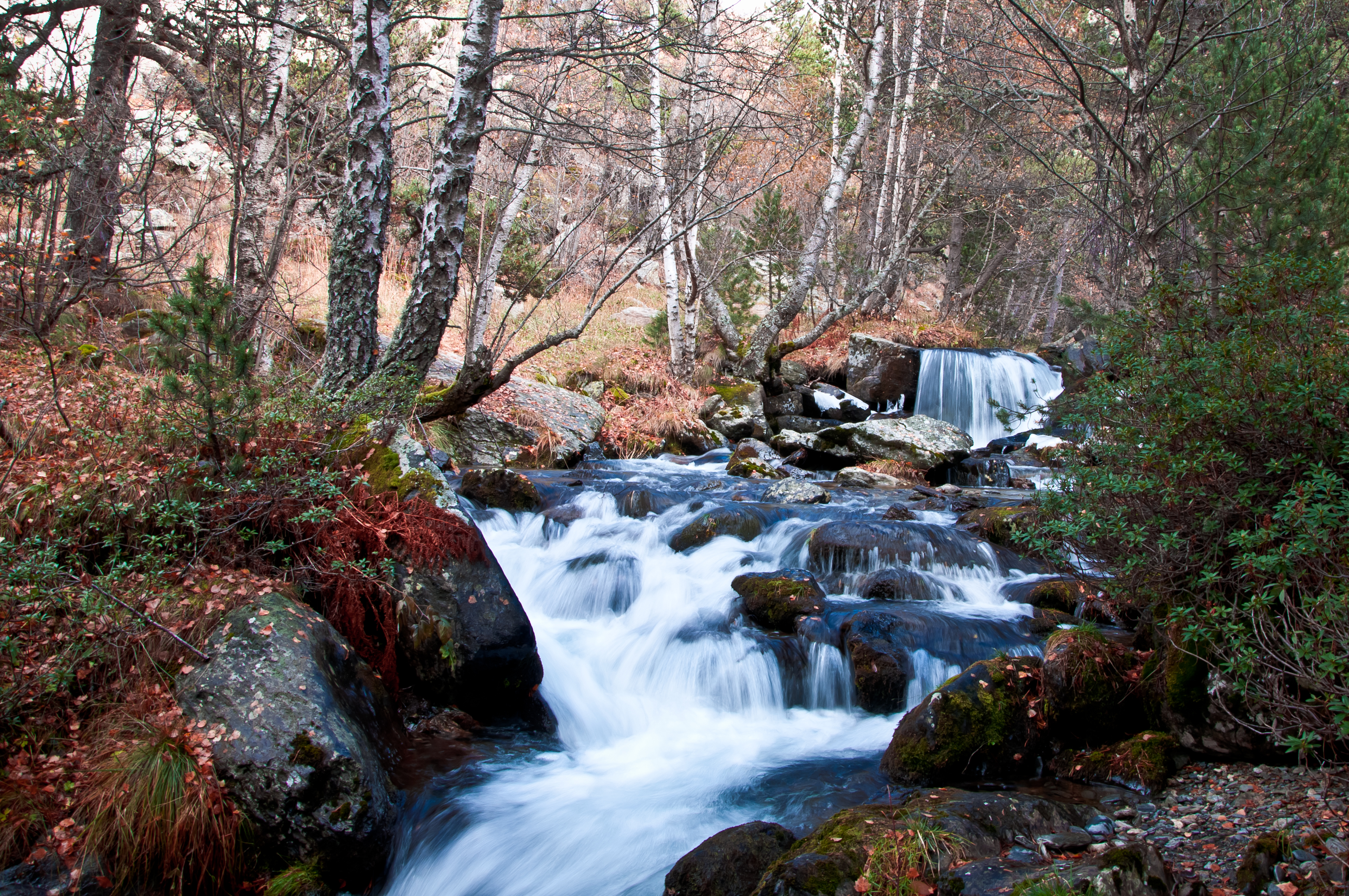
Sorteny National Park

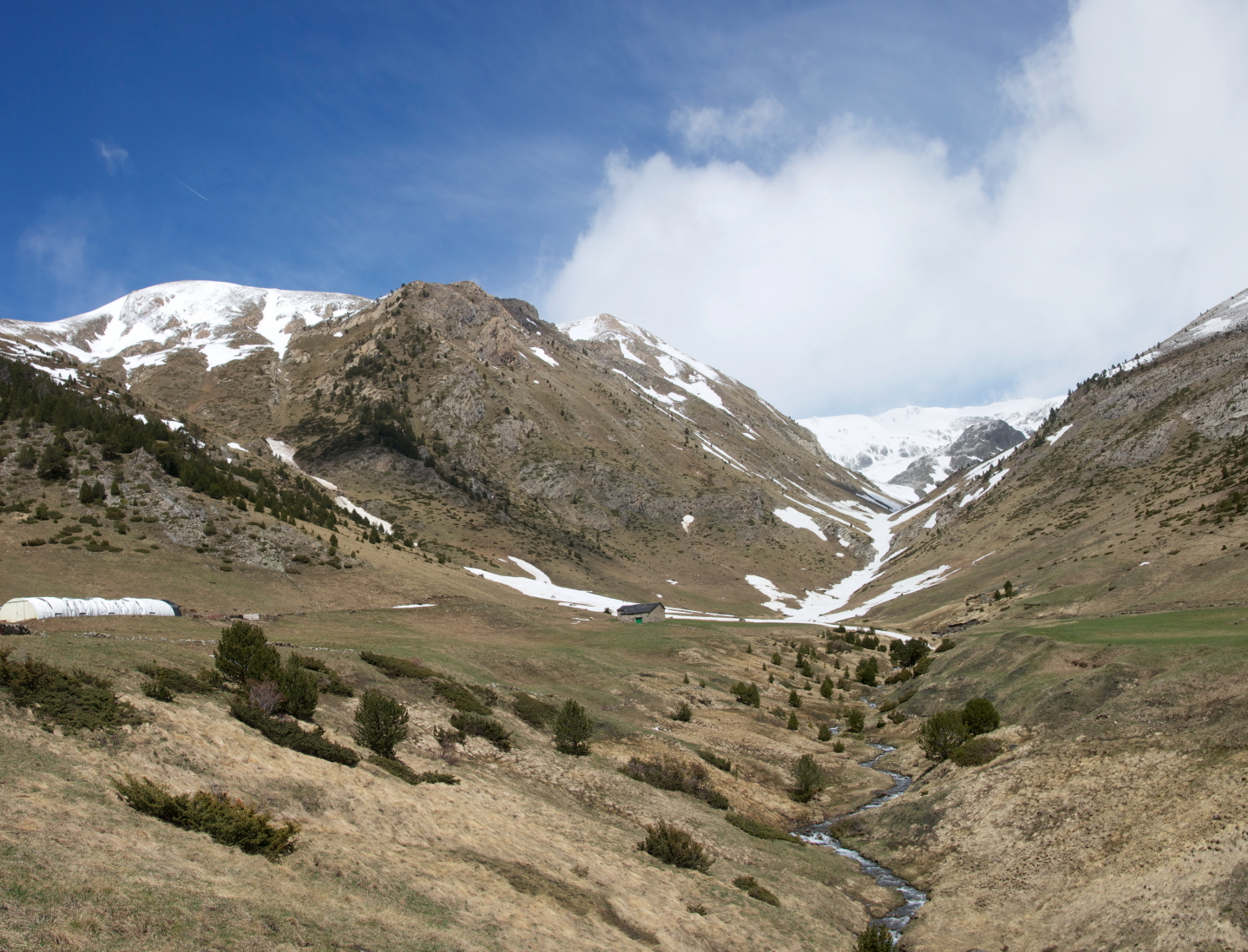
Massís del Casamanya

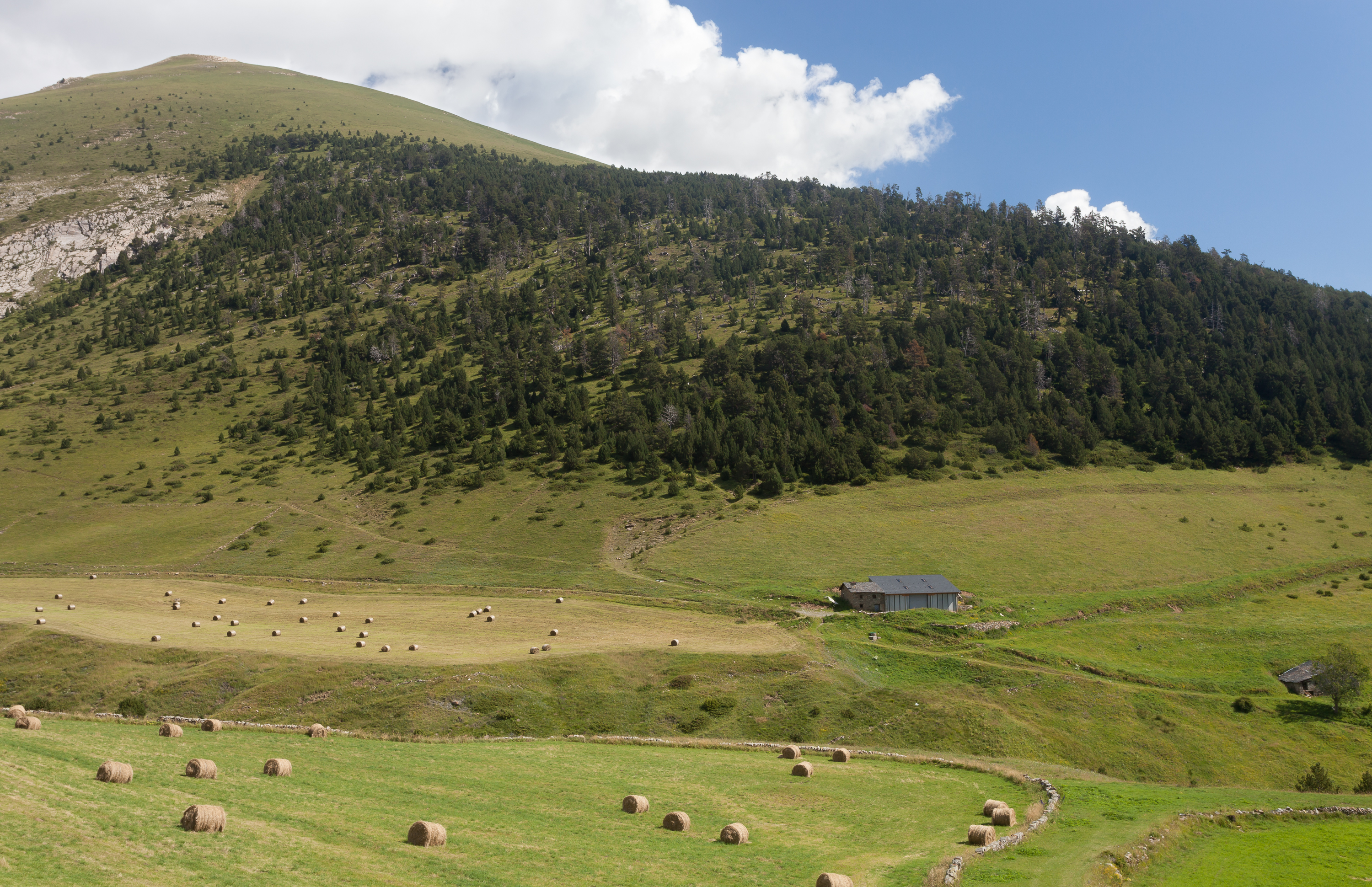
Coll d'Ordino

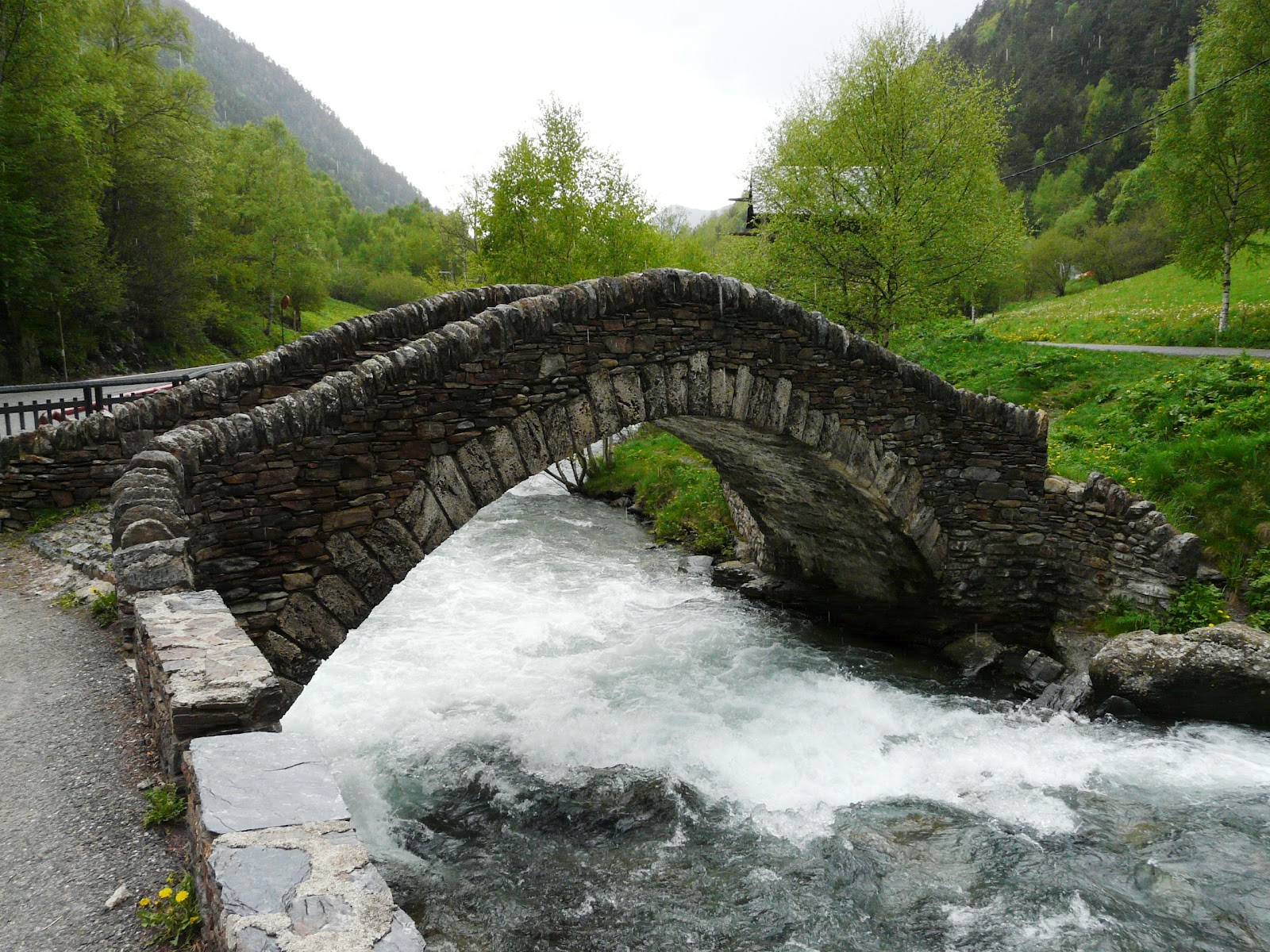
Romanesque bridge of Ordino

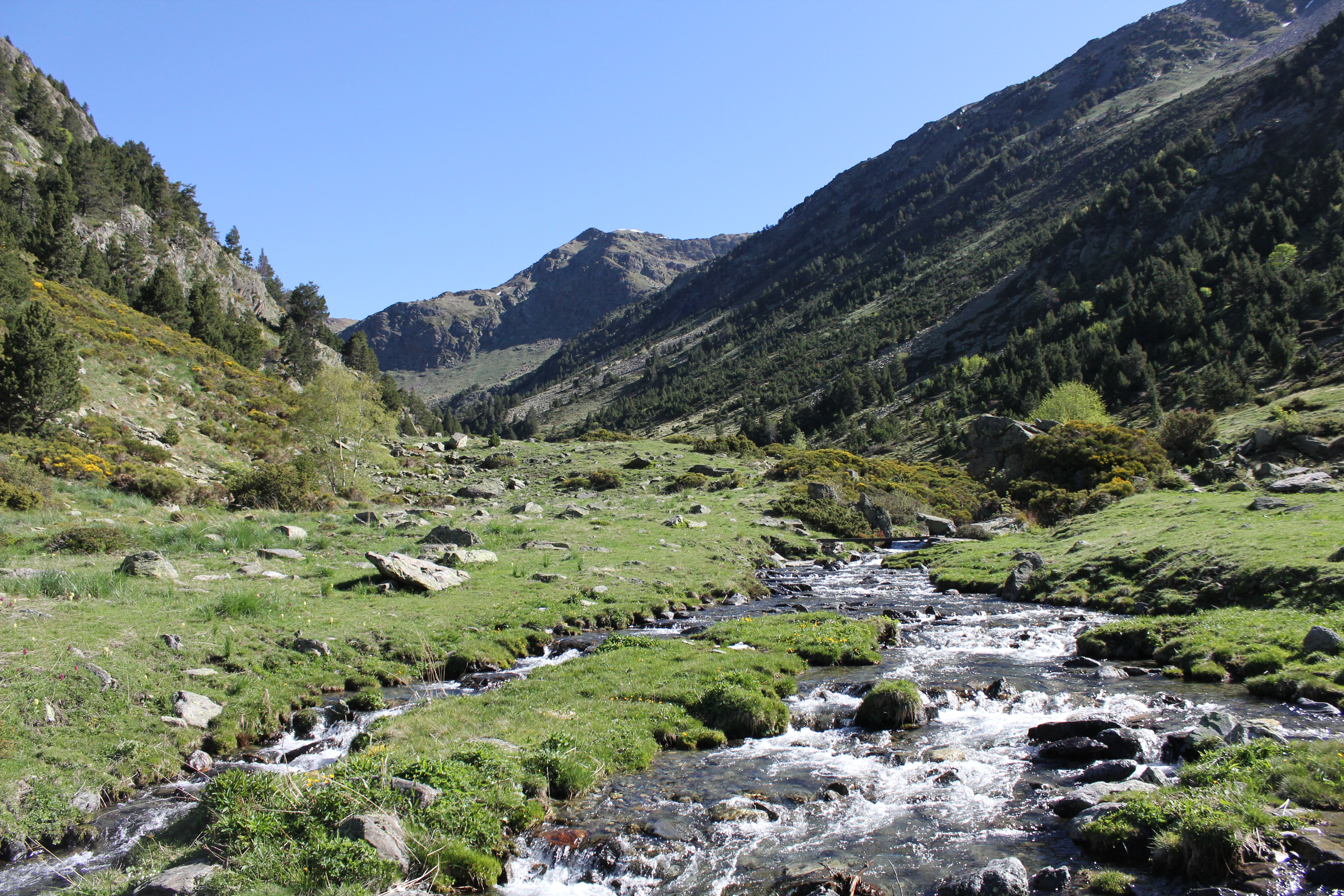
El Rialb

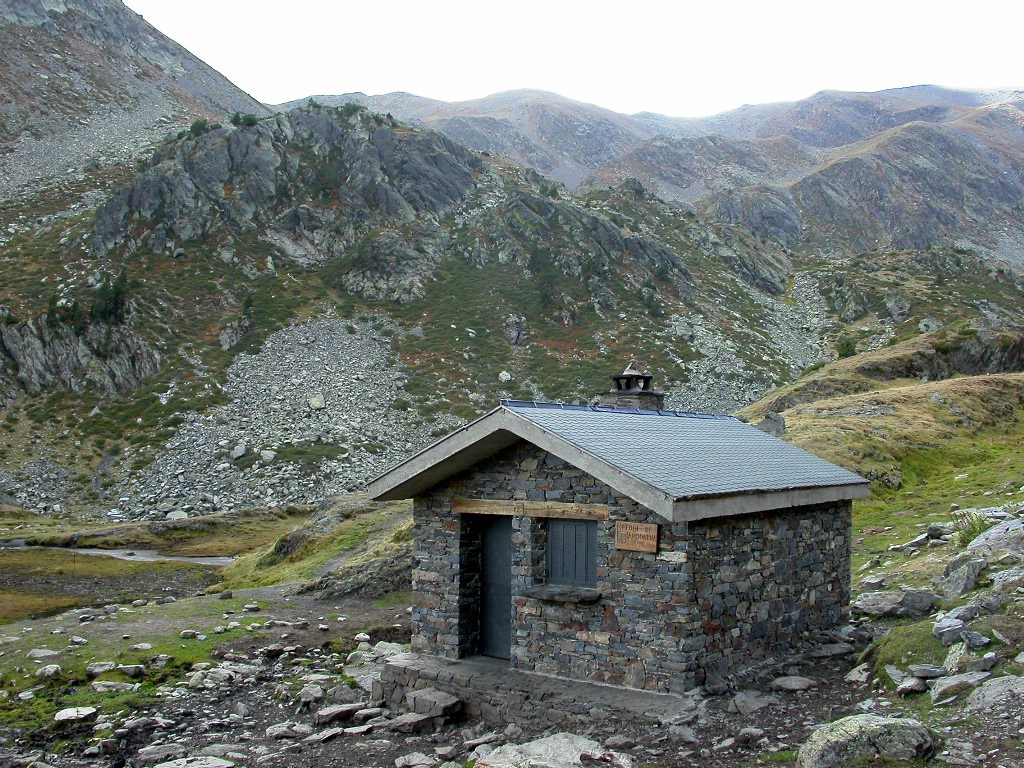
L'Angonella

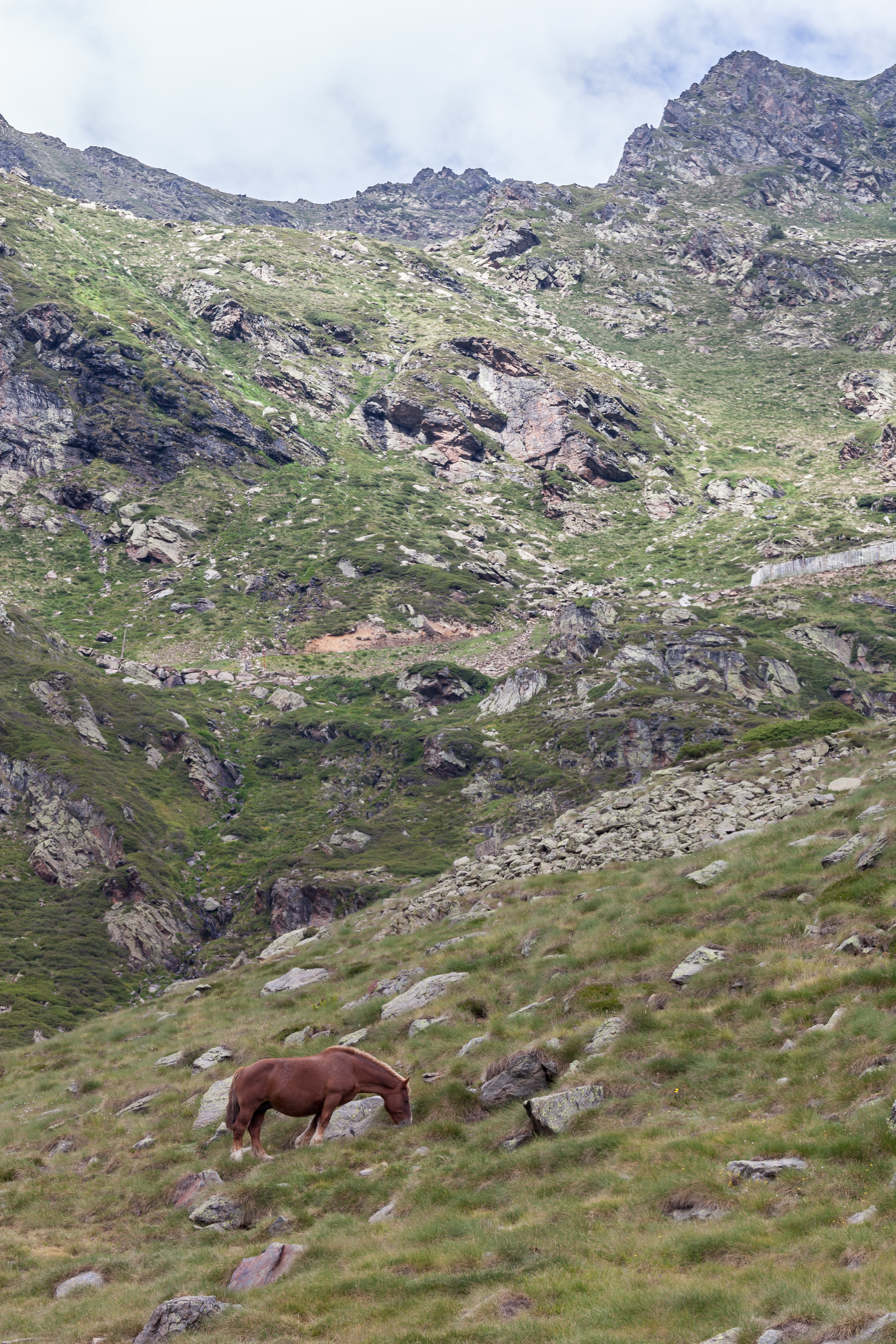
La Coma

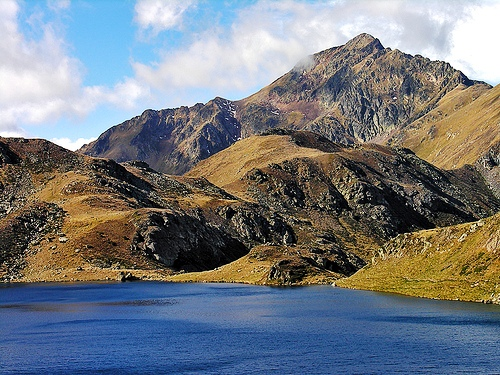
Pic de la Font Blanca
