= La Cortinada =

Village in Ordino, Andorra

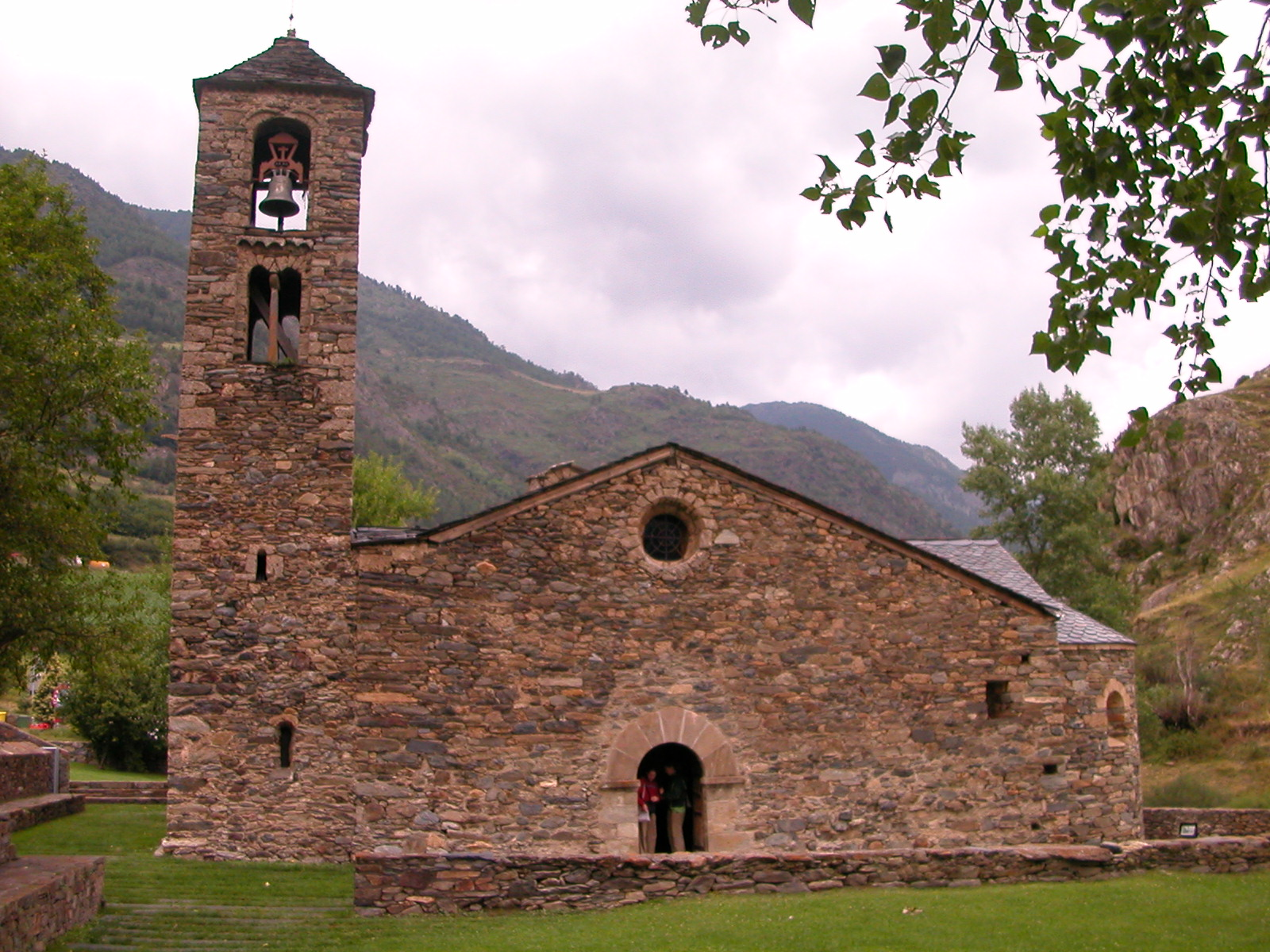
- Sant Martí de la Cortinada, a 12th-century Romanesque church in La Cortinada

- Location in Andorra
- Coordinates: 42°34′N 1°31′E
- Country: Andorra
- Parish: Ordino
- Elevation: 1,346 m (4,416 ft)

Population (2012)
  - Total: 883

La Cortinada (Catalan pronunciation: [la koɾtiˈnaða]) is a village in Andorra, located between the villages of Arans and Ansalonga in the parish of Ordino.

== Main sights ==
In the centre of the village is a 12th-century Romanesque church Sant Martí de la Cortinada; the 17th and 18th century extensions include wrought iron railings made from iron that was forged in Andorra.
