= Ansalonga =

Village in Ordino, Andorra

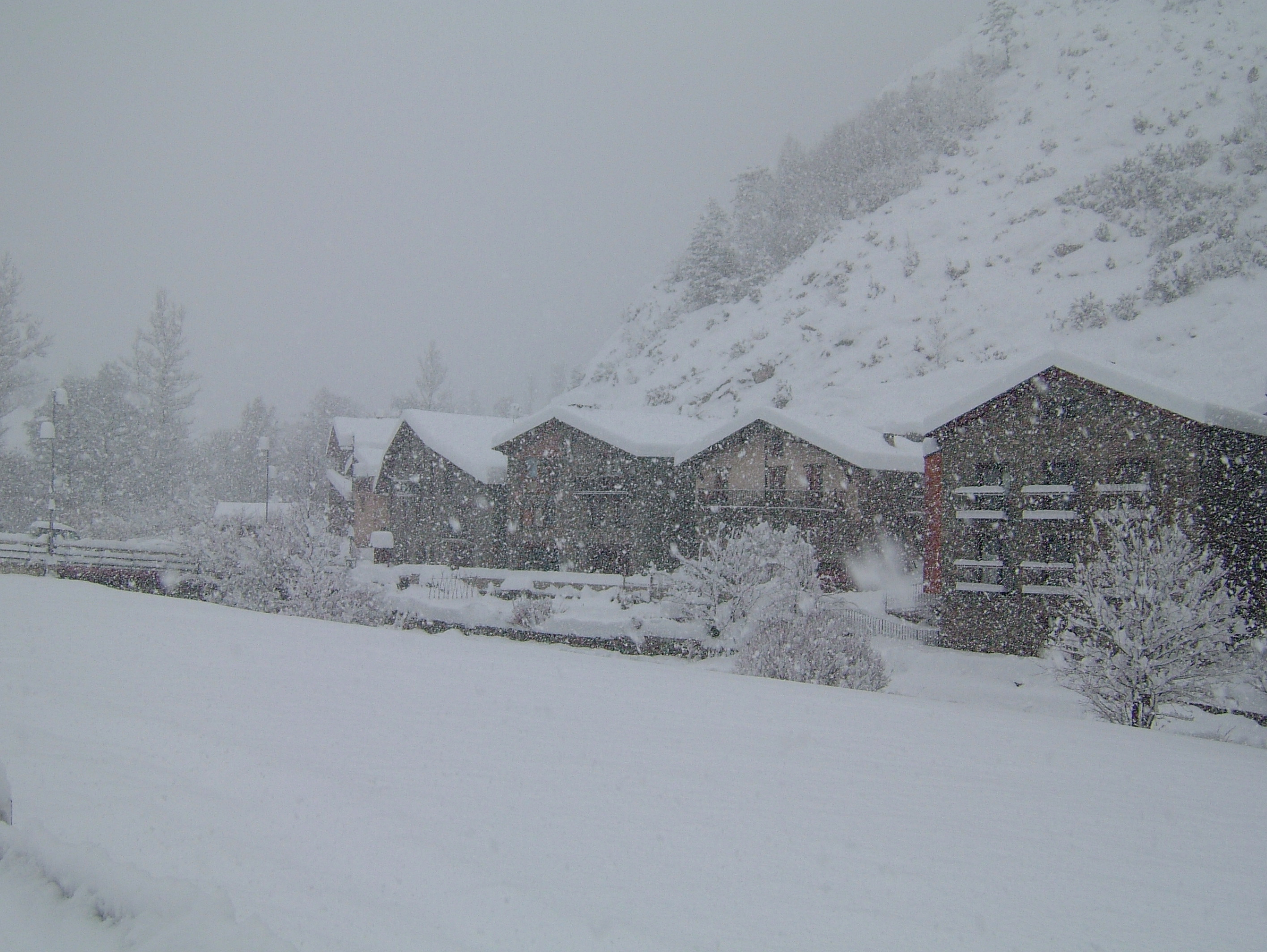
- The centre of Ansalonga in winter

- Location in Andorra
- Coordinates: 42°34′6.40″N 1°31′18.21″E
- Country: Andorra
- Ordino: Ordino
- Elevation: 1,346 m (4,416 ft)

Population (2012)
  - Total: 44

Ansalonga (Catalan pronunciation: [ansaˈloŋɡa]) is a village in Andorra, located in the parish of Ordino in the north of the country.
