= List of hotels in Andorra =

This is a list of hotels in Andorra, which includes current and former hotels and hostels in Andorra.

== Overview ==
Andorra is a small country with population of only 85,000 but its tourism industry services an estimated 10.2 million visitors annually, Visitors are attracted for its skiing and other reasons. There are some hundreds of hotels, hostals, and other accommodations. This is a list of the more notable ones, limited to ones having historic listing status or other clear notability.

Several of its hotels are themselves historic and their buildings are listed by the Cultural Heritage of Andorra. These include Hostal Palanques, Hotel Bellavista, Hotel Carlemany, Hotel Casamanya, Hotel Rosaleda, and Hotel Valira.

== Hotels ==
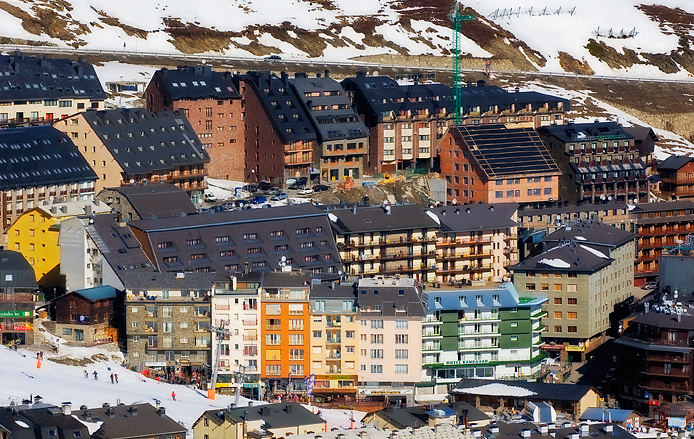
Hotel Kandahar

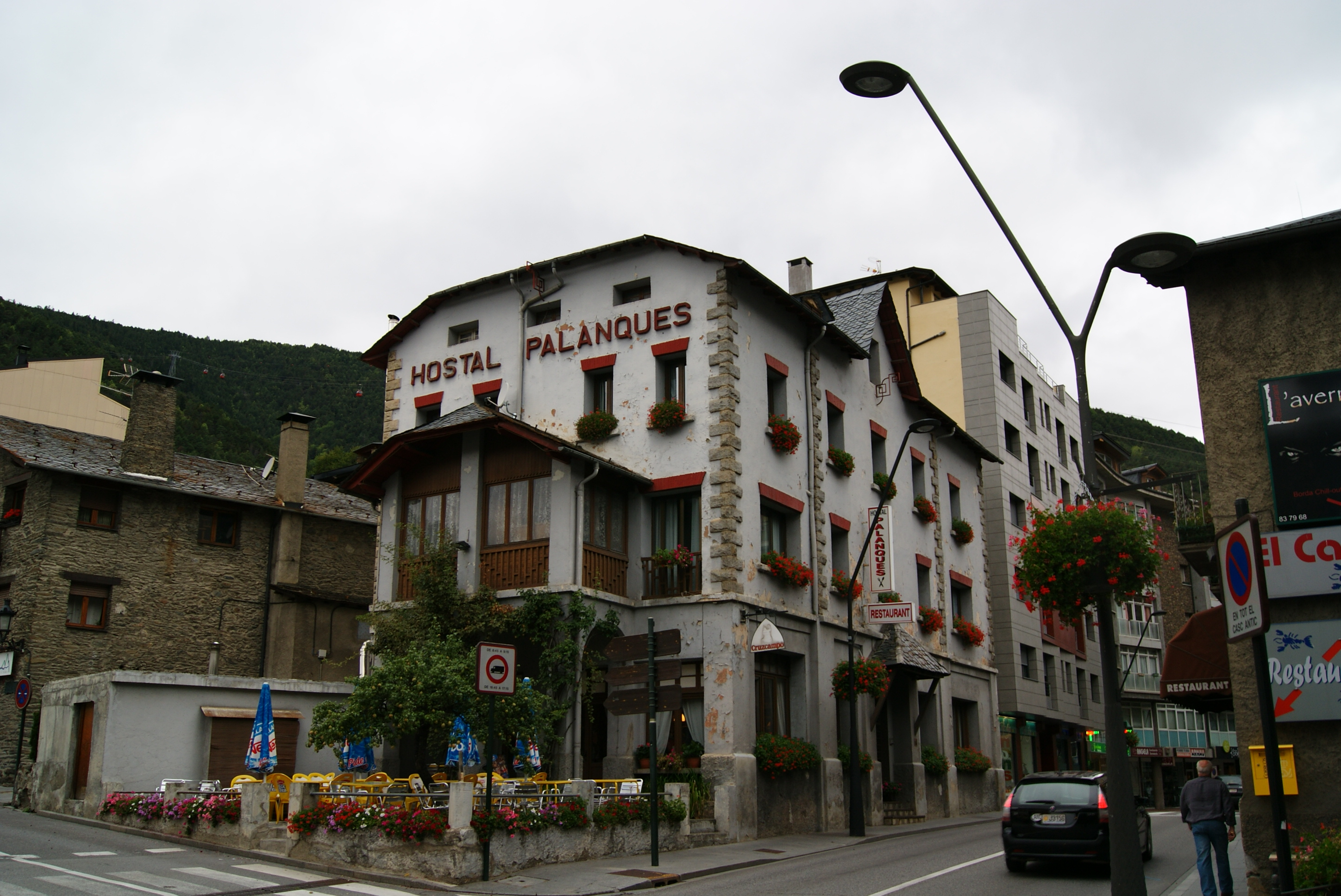
Hostal Palanques

Notable hotels in Andorra include:

=== Hotel Bellavista ===
42.5078°N 1.5245°E Hotel Bellavista is a former hotel located in Andorra la Vella. Its facade is registered in the Cultural Heritage of Andorra. It was built in 1938–40.

=== Hotel Bringué ===
42°37′7″N 1°32′22″E Hotel Bringué is in Ordino

=== Hotel Kandahar ===
42°32′28″N 1°43′55″E Hotel Kandahar is at the El Pas de la Casa ski resort. Hotel Kandahar is a four-star skiing resort hotel in Pas de la Casa, Andorra. It is located in the town centre at an altitude of about 6,840 feet (2,080 m), in close proximity to the ski lift and rental shops.

The hotel contains 63 rooms with a maximum capacity of 160 people, with up to four people per room. Its restaurant, with Hotel Gastronòmic status, serves international cuisine fused with local Andorran culinary influences. A 2007 article by the Chicago Sun-Times noted that it cost 100 euros a night and featured a dance club in the basement, meeting "Andorra's earlier reputation as a party haven". The hotel is only open during the skiing season (from December to April).

The hotel is now a spa hotel; the spa opened in December 2012, featuring a "sauna, a hammam, a Jacuzzi, a hot and cold footbath, two hotbeds and three hydro jet showers".

=== Hostal Palanques ===
Hostal Palanques is a hostal located at Avinguda Sant Antoni, 16 in La Massana Parish. It is a heritage property registered in the Cultural Heritage of Andorra. It was built in 1933–35.

=== Hotel Pyrénées ===
Hotel Pyrénées is a four-star hotel in Andorra la Vella, Andorra.

=== Sport Hotel ===
42°34′34″N 1°40′11″E Sport Hotel is a four-star 148-room resort hotel in Soldeu, Andorra.
