= List of bridges in Andorra =

This is a list of bridges and viaducts in Andorra, including those for pedestrians and vehicular traffic.

== Historical and architectural interest bridges ==
| | Name | Distinction | Length | Type | Carries Crosses | Opened | Location | Parish | Ref. |
|---|---|---|---|---|---|---|---|---|---|
| 1 | Pont de la Margineda | Cultural heritage monument | 33 m (108 ft) | Masonry; 1 segmental arch | Footbridge; Gran Valira | 15th century | Santa Coloma d'Andorra; 42°29′3.1″N 1°29′31.2″E | Andorra la Vella | |
| 2 | Pont dels Escalls | Cultural heritage monument | | Masonry; 1 semi-circular arch | Footbridge; Valira del Nord | | Les Escaldes; 42°30′48″N 1°32′5.3″E | Escaldes-Engordany | |
| 3 | Pont de Sant Antoni de la Grella | Cultural heritage monument | 21 m (69 ft) | Masonry; 1 pointed arch | Footbridge; Valira del Nord | | Anyós–Sispony; 42°31′31.5″N 1°31′15.6″E | La Massana | |
| 4 | Pont d'Ordino | | | Masonry; 1 segmental arch | Footbridge; Valira del Nord | | El Serrat–Llorts; 42°36′24.5″N 1°32′13.7″E | Ordino | (Note: Originally located on the old road that linked the villages of Ordino and El Serrat, the bridge was moved on February 15, 1980 to the north of the village of Llorts due to work on the CG-3 road.) |
| 5 | Pont d'Engordany | Cultural heritage monument | | Masonry; 1 semi-circular arch | Footbridge; Valira d'Orient | 1785 | Les Escaldes; 42°30′33″N 1°32′33.5″E | Escaldes-Engordany | |
| 6 | Pont Pla | Cultural heritage monument | 12 m (39 ft) | Masonry; 1 segmental arch | Footbridge; Valira del Nord | 18th century | Andorra la Vella–Les Escaldes; 42°31′2.7″N 1°31′34.7″E | Andorra la Vella; Escaldes-Engordany | |
| 7 | Pont de la Tosca | Cultural heritage monument | | Masonry; 1 semi-circular arch, granite | Riu Madriu | 1820 | Les Escaldes; 42°30′33.4″N 1°32′43.8″E | Escaldes-Engordany | |
| 8 | Pont de Sassanat | Located on the GR 7 trail Madriu-Perafita-Claror Valley; World Heritage Site; Cultural heritage monument | | Masonry; 1 segmental arch, granite | Riu Madriu | 1944 | Les Escaldes; 42°30′2.8″N 1°33′14.9″E | Escaldes-Engordany | |
| 9 | Pont nou de la Margineda | Cultural heritage monument | | Masonry; 1 segmental arch, granite | Road bridge Carrer dels Emprius; Gran Valira | 20th century | Santa Coloma d'Andorra; 42°29′0.5″N 1°29′24.8″E | Andorra la Vella | |
| 10 | Pont d'Anyós | Cultural heritage monument | | Masonry; 1 semi-circular arch, granite | Valira del Nord | 1952 | Anyós–Sispony; 42°32′5.7″N 1°31′18.5″E | La Massana | |
| 11 | Pont de Paris | | 44 m (144 ft) | Cable-stayed; Composite steel/concrete deck, steel pylon | Road bridge Av. Consell d'Europa; Gran Valira | 2006 | Andorra la Vella; 42°30′33.2″N 1°31′50.4″E | Andorra la Vella | |
| 12 | Pont de Madrid | | 60 m (200 ft) | Cable-stayed; Composite steel/concrete deck, steel pylon | Main Road CG1; Gran Valira | 2008 | Andorra la Vella; 42°29′17.7″N 1°29′41.7″E | Andorra la Vella | |
| 13 | La Massana Bridge | | 156 m (512 ft) | Cable-stayed; Concrete girder deck, concrete pylons Twin bridges 86+70 | Andorra la Vella northern bypass Valira d'Orient | 2012 | La Massana; 42°31′46.4″N 1°31′18.1″E | La Massana | |
| 14 | Canillo Tibetan Bridge | Height : 158 m (518 ft) | 603 m (1,978 ft) | Suspension; Steel | Footbridge; Riu de la Vall del Riu | 2021 | Canillo; 42°34′37.5″N 1°36′48.9″E | Canillo | |

== Notes and references ==
- Notes
- "Patrimoni Cultural" [Cultural heritage]. Cultura.ad - Ministry of Culture - Andorra Government (in Catalan).
- Nicolas Janberg. "International Database for Civil and Structural Engineering". Structurae.com.
- Others references

== See also ==
- Transport in Andorra
- Geography of Andorra
- List of rivers of Andorra
- ca:Llista de carreteres d'Andorra (in Catalan) - List of roads in Andorra
