= Llorts =

Village in Ordino, Andorra

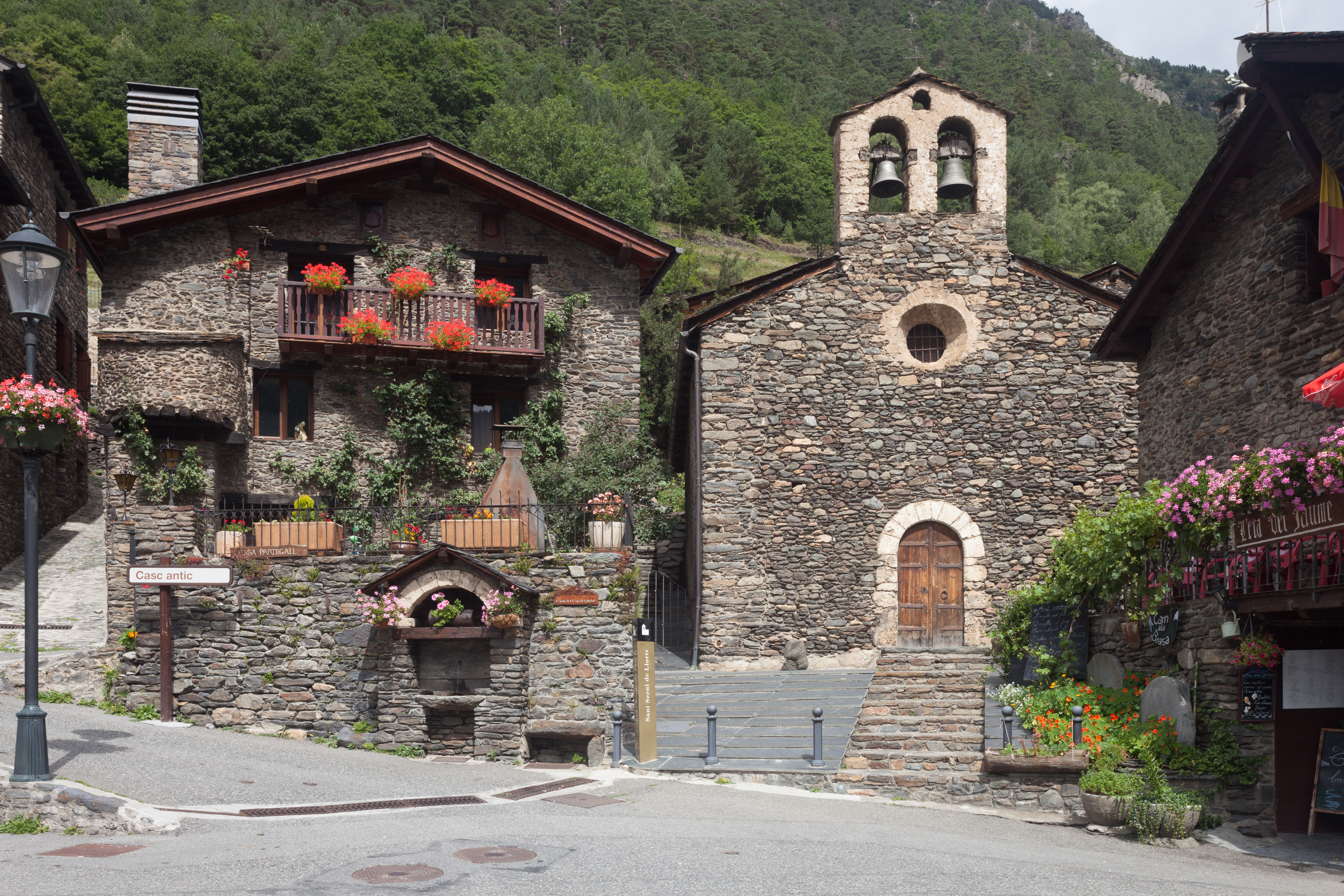
- The Church of Sant Serni de Llorts (right)

- Location in Andorra
- Coordinates: 42°35′47″N 1°31′36″E
- Country: Andorra
- Parish: Ordino
- Elevation: 1,413 m (4,636 ft)

Population (2016)
  - Total: 175

Llorts (Catalan pronunciation: [ˈʎɔɾts]) is a village in northern Andorra, situated within the Gran Valira valley. Administratively, it is part of the parish of Ordino. The village is known for its traditional Andorran buildings and Romanesque church, as well as the historic Llorts mine located nearby. The area surrounding Llorts is popular among hikers, and the village is located along a GR footpath.

== Etymology ==
The name Llorts, like the names of many other villages in the Gran Valira valley, is of Basque origin and predates the arrival of the Romans. Catalan linguist Joan Coromines proposed that the root of the name may be lurte, which means "avalanches of stones" in Catalan, Basque, and Aragonese.

Historical spellings of Llorts recorded in literature include: Lorc (1176), Lorz (1231 and 1364), Lorez (1394), Lortz (1405 and 1470), Lorts (1407 and 1410), Lorç (1448), and Lors (1482, 1489, and 1499).

== Architecture and tourism ==
The buildings of Llorts are designed in the style of traditional Andorran architecture, bearing stone walls and slate roofs. The Church of Sant Serni de Llorts is a prominent symbol of the village and is distinguished by its Romanesque design. The church exterior features a gabled bell tower, while its interior contains a baroque altarpiece dedicated to Jesus.

Located near Llorts is the decommissioned Llorts mine, where iron ore was extracted for four years in the 19th century. Mining was an important part of Andorra's economy from the 17th to 19th centuries; 30 meters of the mine's former tunnels now serve as a cultural history museum. Llorts mine is a stop on the Pyrenean Iron Route (or Iron Route in the Pyrenees, a multi-country cultural heritage route created by the European Institute of Cultural Routes.

The area around Llorts is a popular hiking destination. A 120-kilometre (75 mi)-long, looped GR footpath passes through Llorts.

== Geography ==
Llorts is located 1,413 metres (4,636 ft) above sea level within the Gran Valira valley, near the confluence of the Valira d'Ordino (Valira d'Orient) and Llengonella (Riu l'Angonella).

== Demographics ==
Historical population of Llorts
Year	Pop.	±%
1984	81	—
1985	91	+12.3%
1986	103	+13.2%
1987	99	−3.9%
1988	100	+1.0%
1989	99	−1.0%
1990	100	+1.0%
1991	107	+7.0%
1992	104	−2.8%
1993	122	+17.3%
1994	103	−15.6%
1995	111	+7.8%
1996	126	+13.5%
1997	121	−4.0%
1998	121	+0.0%
1999	118	−2.5%
2000	126	+6.8%
2001	125	−0.8%
2002	113	−9.6%
2003	129	+14.2%
2004	139	+7.8%
2005	140	+0.7%
2006	143	+2.1%
2007	157	+9.8%
2008	147	−6.4%
2009	145	−1.4%
2010	163	+12.4%
2011	155	−4.9%
2012	154	−0.6%
2013	168	+9.1%
2014	181	+7.7%
2015	162	−10.5%
2016	175	+8.0%
2017	175	+0.0%
Source: Andorran Department of Statistics

The population of Llorts was 175 in 2016. One of the earliest records of the population of Llorts was in 1838, when the village's population was 80.

== Gallery ==
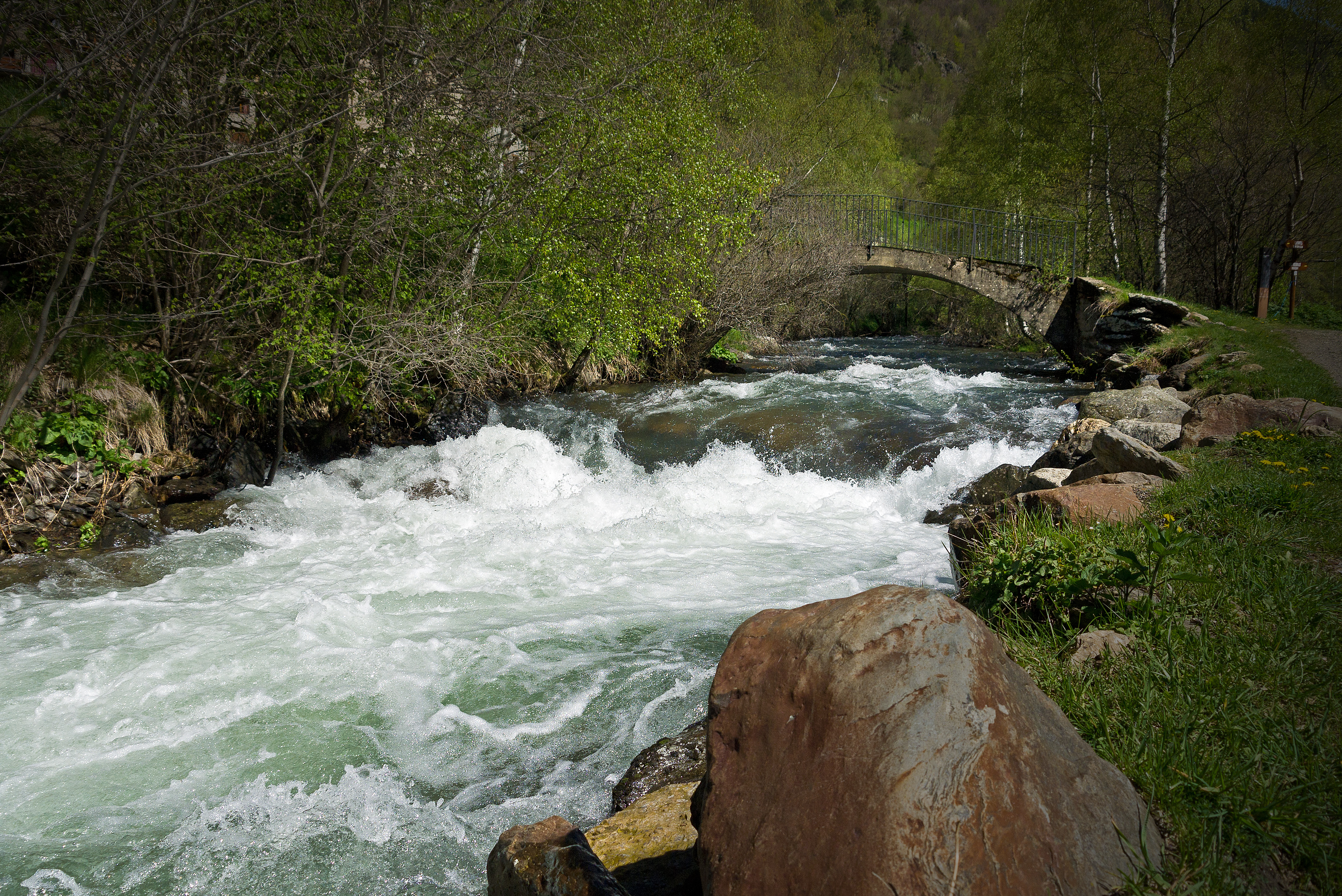
The Valira d'Ordino river in Llorts

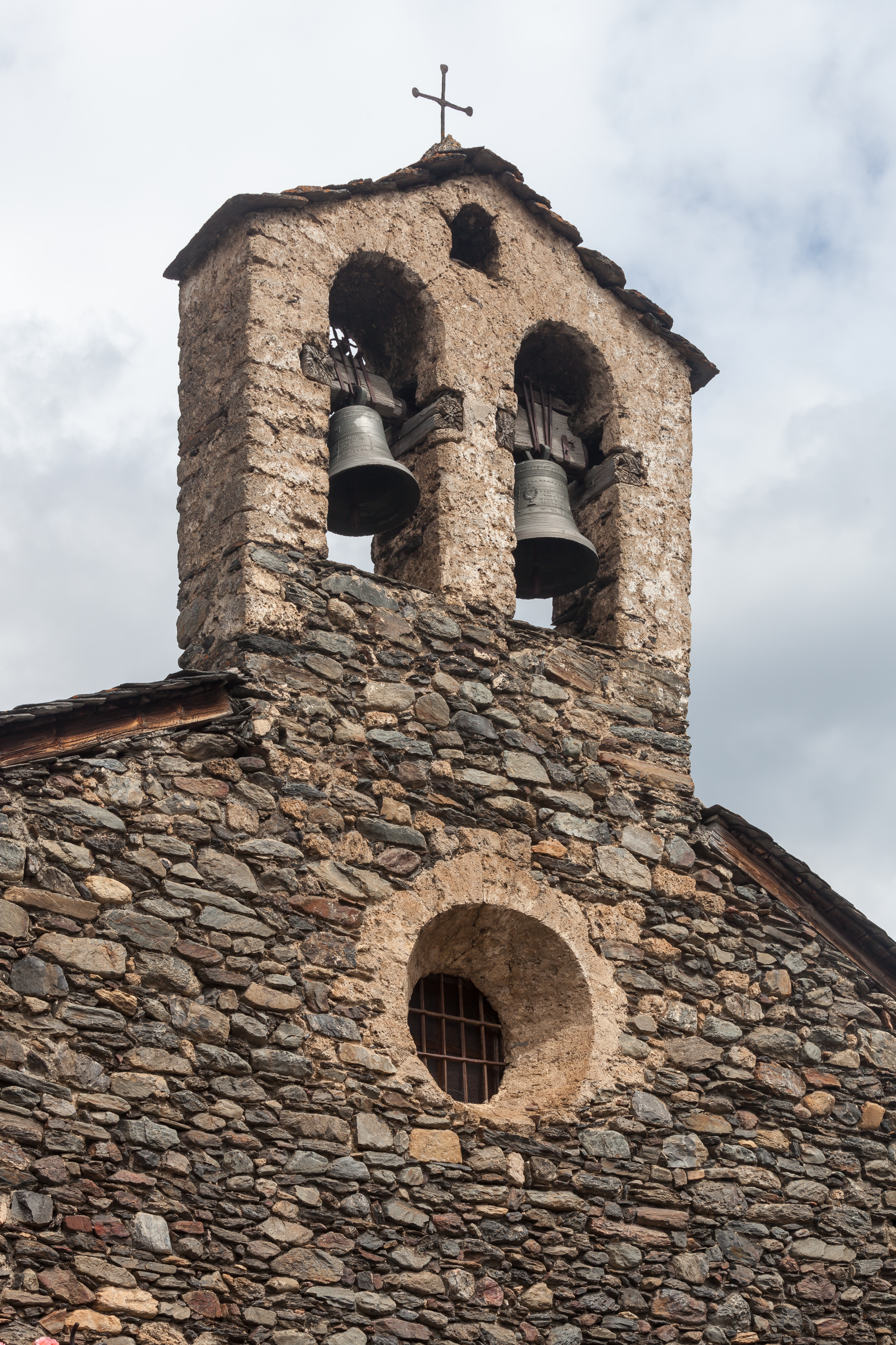
Bell tower of the Church of Sant Serni de Llorts

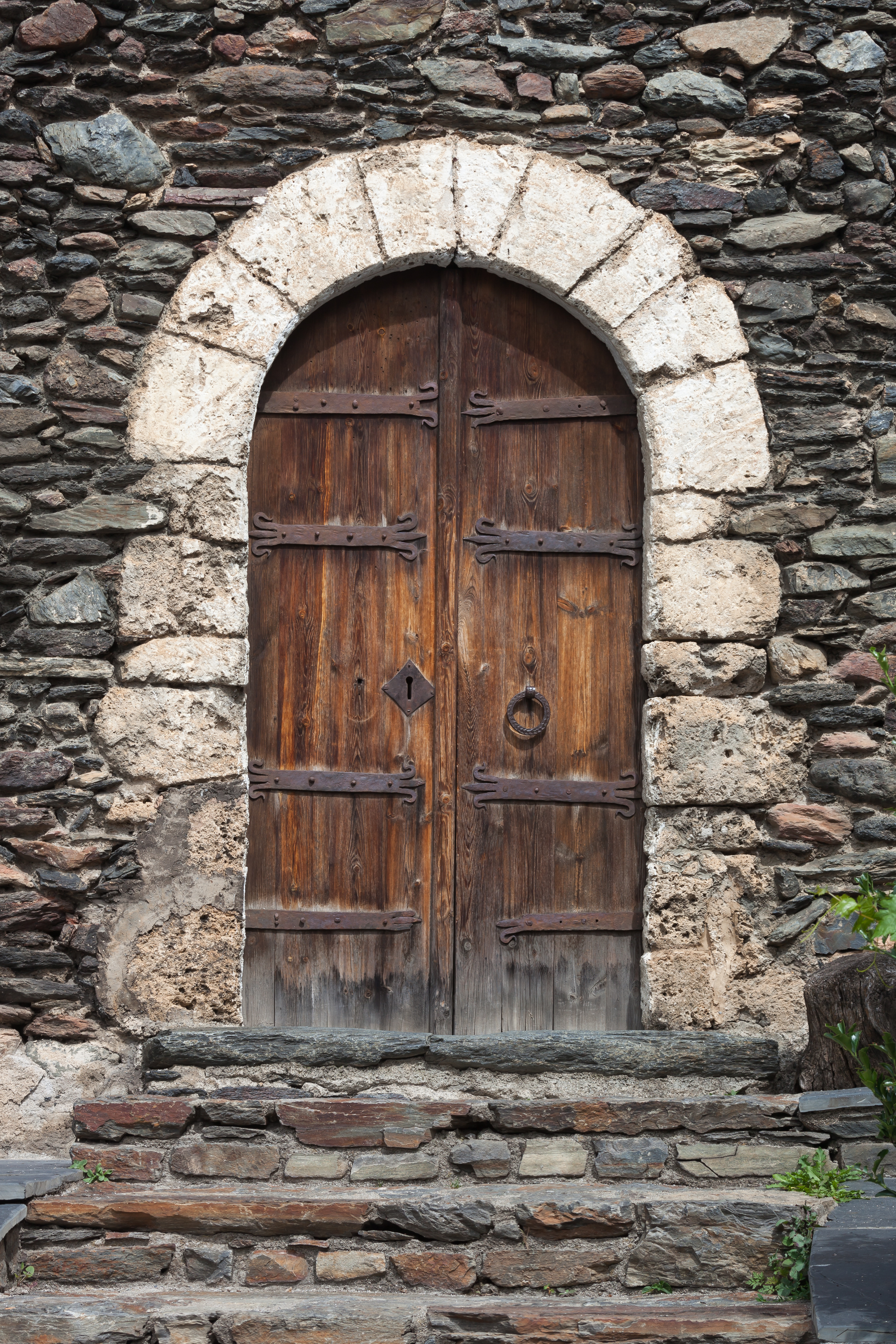
Entrance of the Church of Sant Serni de Llorts

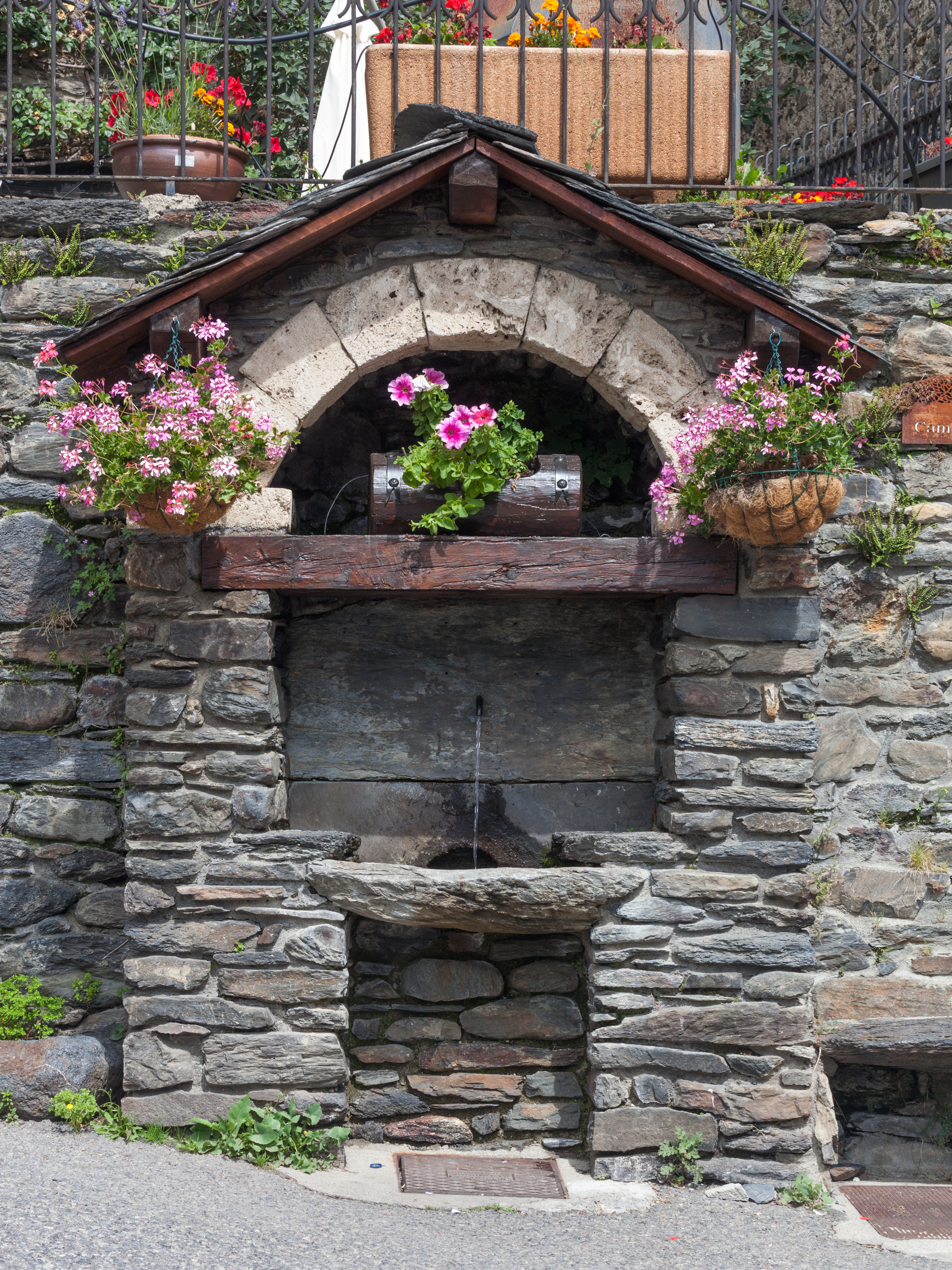
Village fountain of Llorts

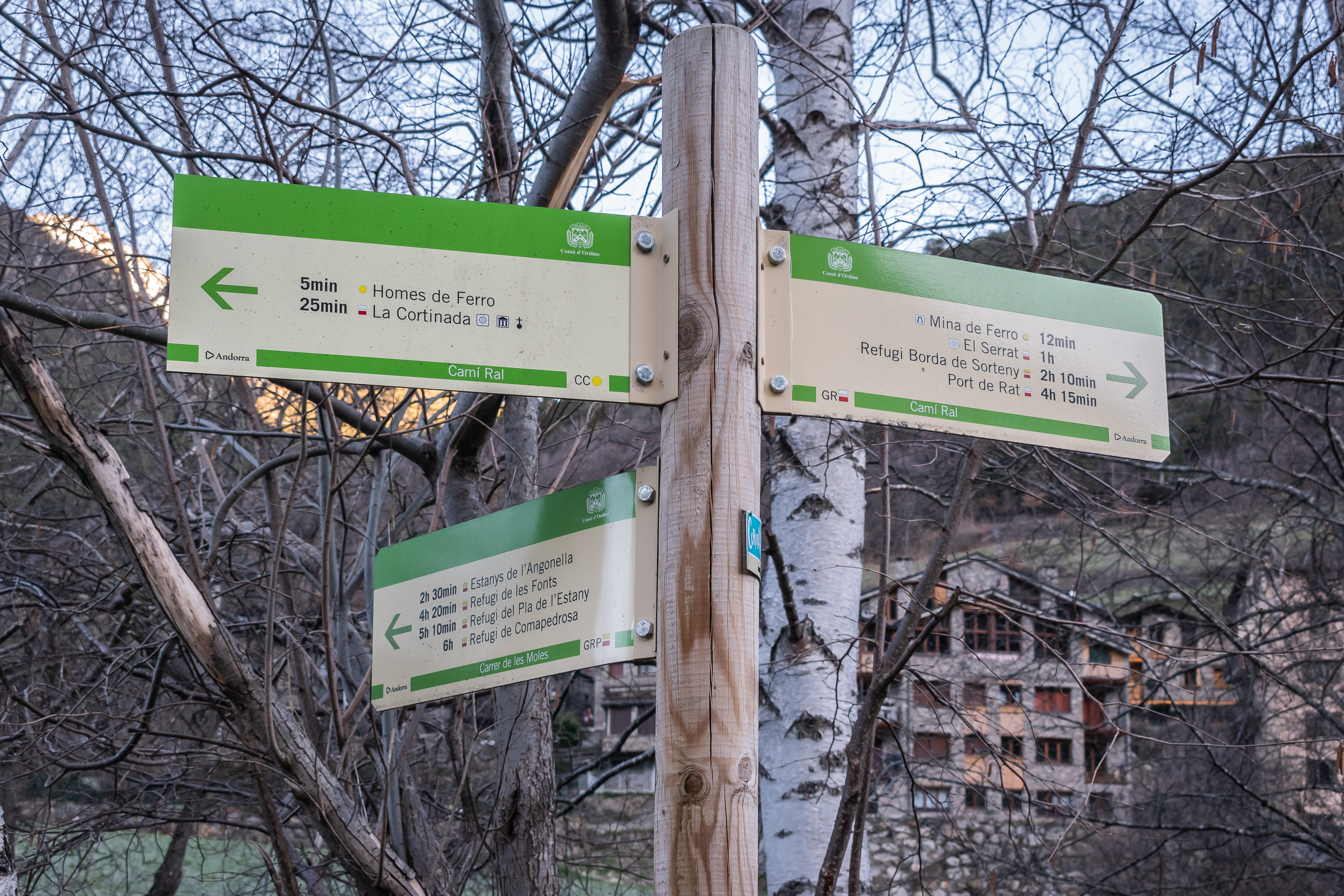
Sign in Llorts giving directions to nearby hiking spots
