= Pont nou de la Margineda =

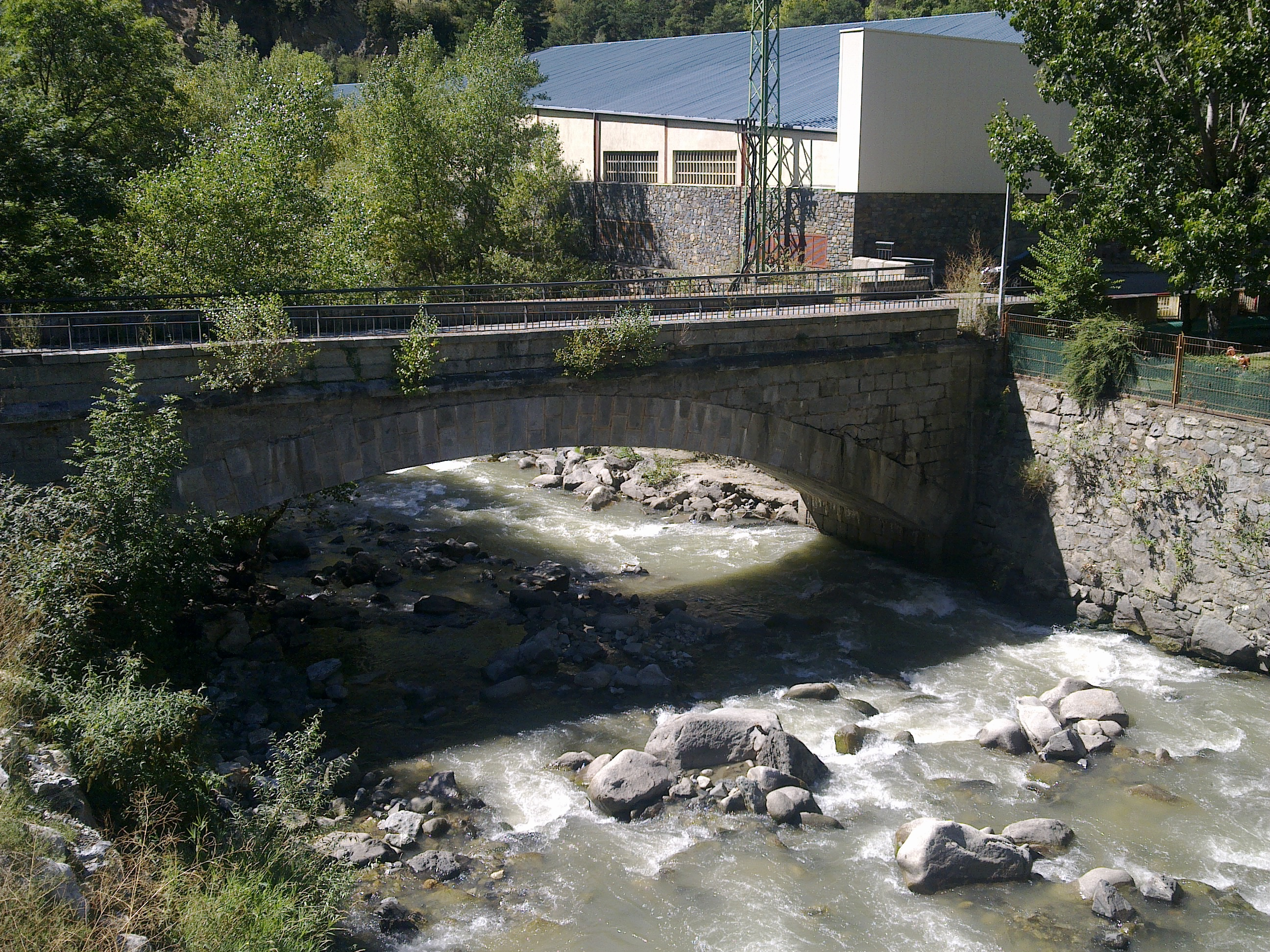
- Coordinates: 42°29′0.5″N 1°29′24.8″E
- Carries: Motor vehicles, Pedestrians
- Crosses: Gran Valira
- Locale: Santa Coloma d'Andorra, Andorra

Characteristics
- Design: Masonry bridge

History
- Opened: 20th century

Pont nou de la Margineda is a bridge in Santa Coloma d'Andorra, Andorra.

It is a masonry bridge, consisting of a single granite arch, which was built on the Gran Valira river in the 1930s, a hundred metres from the medieval bridge of La Margineda. It has been classified as a monument of cultural interest since July 2004.

== See also ==
- List of bridges in Andorra
