= Hotel Bringué =

Hotel in El Serrat, Andorra

- Interactive map of the Hotel Bringué area

General information
- Location: El Serrat, Andorra
- Coordinates: 42°37′7″N 1°32′22″E

Other information
- Number of rooms: 110

Hotel Bringué is a country house hotel in El Serrat, Ordino parish, Andorra. The hotel contains 110 rooms and its restaurant with a total capacity of 250 persons has views of the Valira North waterfalls.
