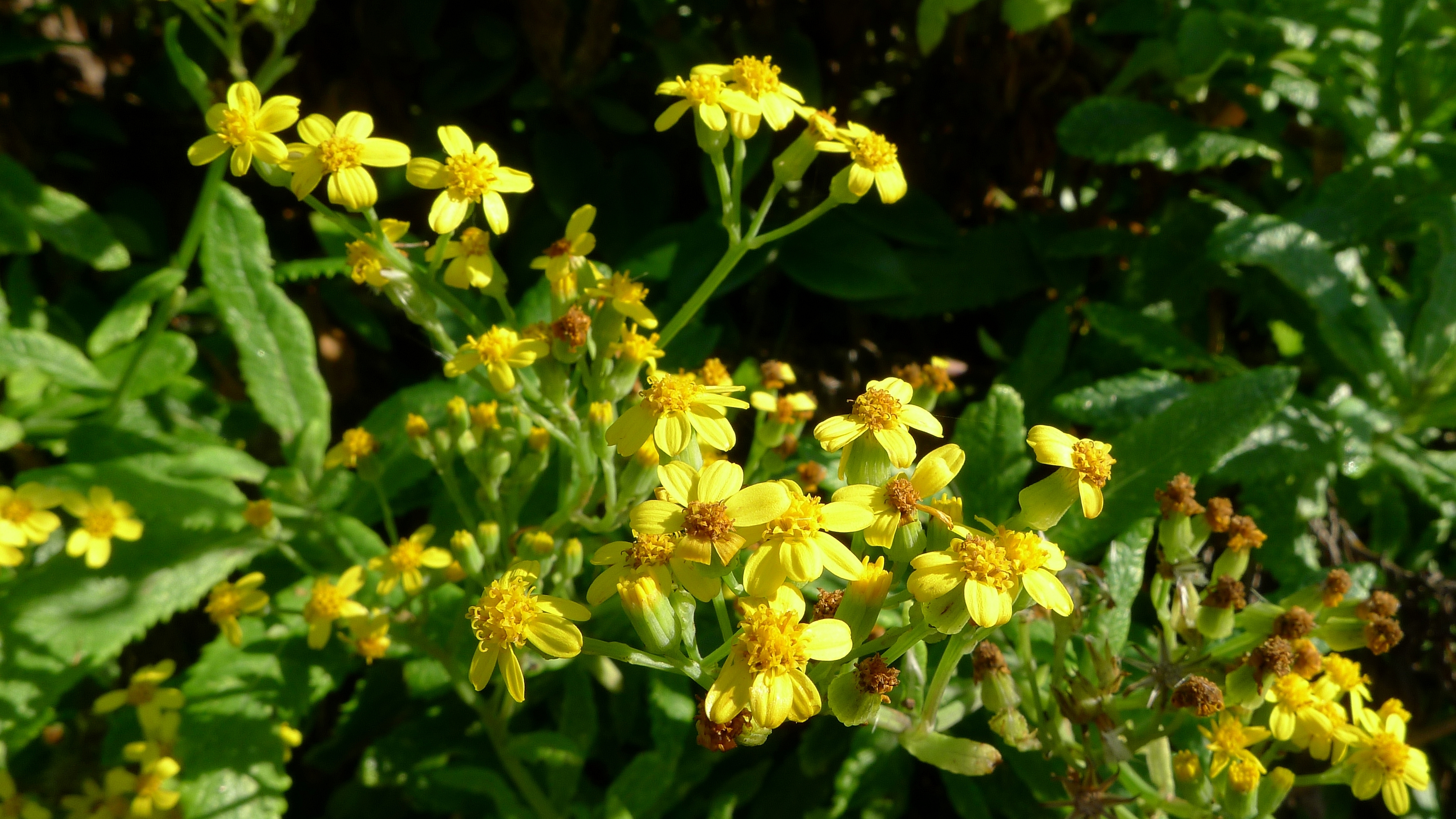
- Madagascar ragwort

Scientific classification
- Kingdom: Plantae
- Clade: Tracheophytes
- Clade: Angiosperms
- Clade: Eudicots
- Clade: Asterids
- Order: Asterales
- Family: Asteraceae
- Genus: Senecio
- Species: S. madagascariensis

Binomial name
- Senecio madagascariensis Poir. (1817)

Synonyms
- Senecio burchellii auct. - non DC. Senecio incognitus Cabrera; Senecio junodianus O.Hoffm. Senecio ruderalis Harv. Sources: IPNI, AFPD

= Senecio madagascariensis =

Species of flowering plant

Senecio madagascariensis, also known as Madagascar ragwort, is a species of the genus Senecio and family Asteraceae that is native to Southern Africa. Other common names include Madagascar groundsel and fireweed. It has been included on the noxious weeds list for Hawaii and the reject list for Australia. S.madagascariensis is the diploid cytotype of S.inaequidens.

== Description ==
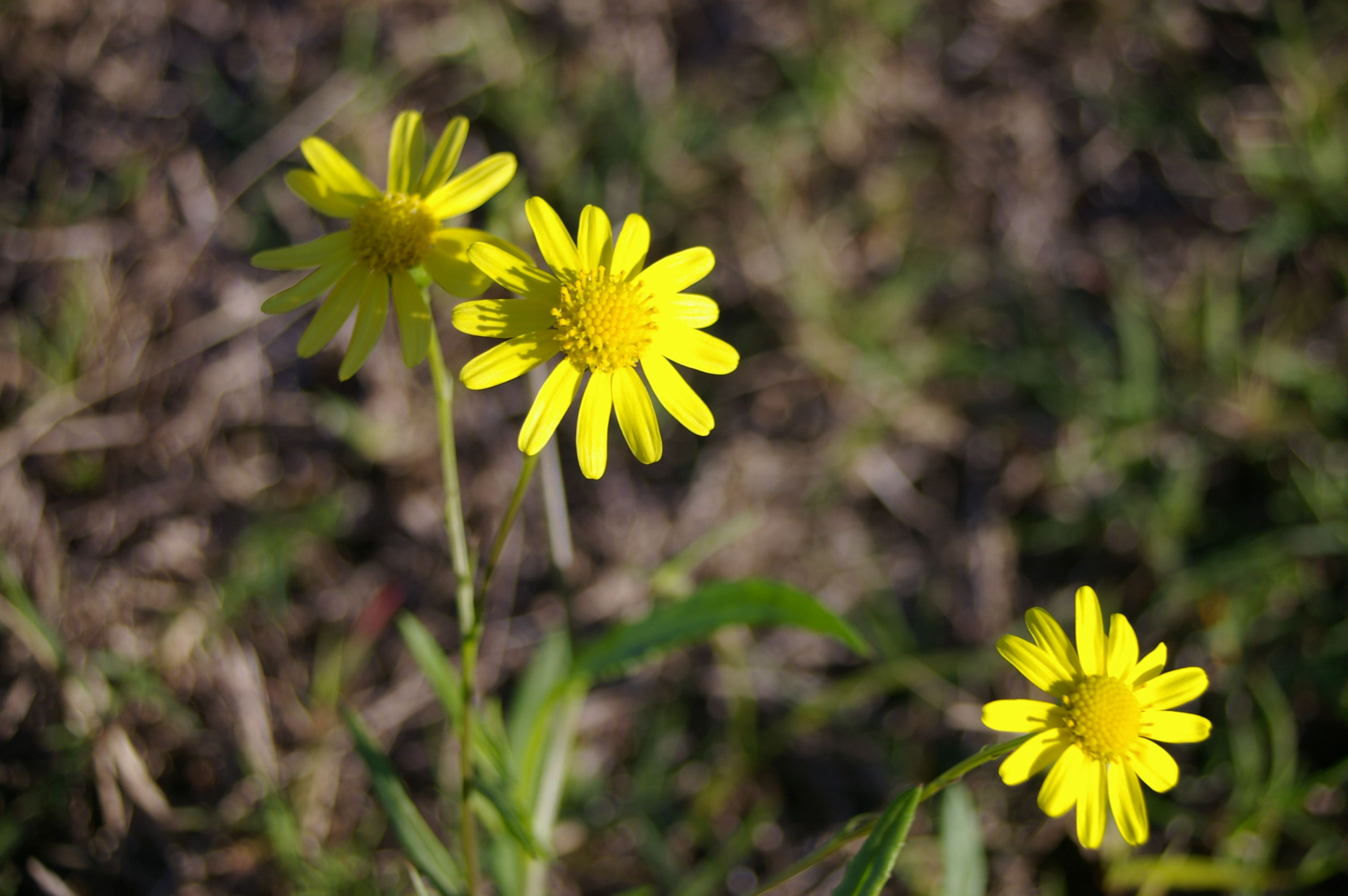
Flowers

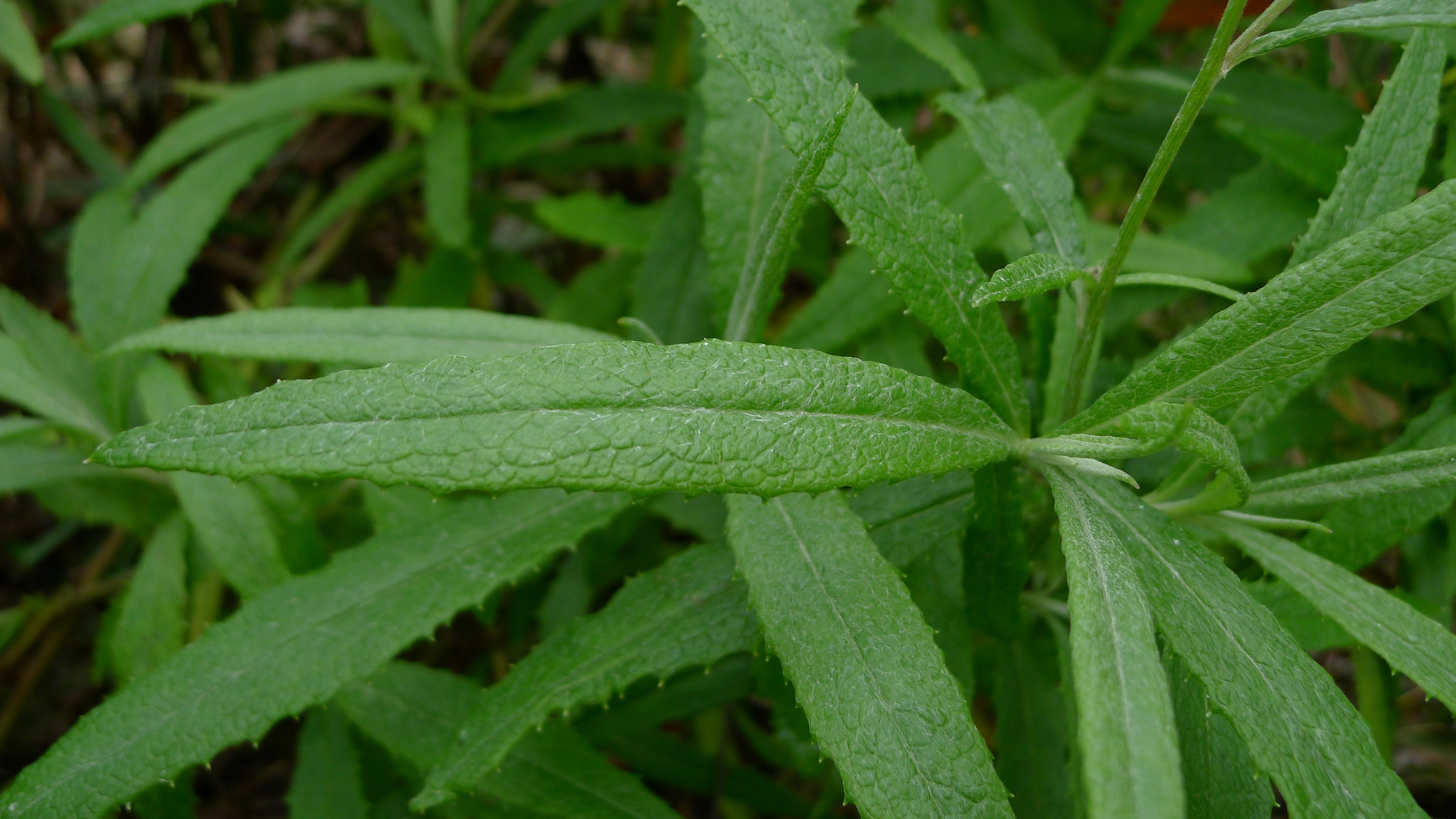
Leaves

It is an erect, glabrous (smooth stemmed) herb that grows up to 20–60 cm in length. It may become woody and shrub-like in appropriate conditions. Leaves are alternate, narrow-lanceolate to elliptic in shape, usually bright green, smooth with margins that are lobed, serrate or entire. The broader, larger leaves are stem clenching and fleshy, 2–7 cm long and 3-10mm wide.

The flowerhead, which is part of an unfirm corymb, is made up of disc florets and ray florets, and is small, yellow and daisy-like, from 1–2 cm in diameter. The plant flowers between late autumn and early spring in its native area. The fruit is an achene that is 1.5-2.5mm long and is brown-coloured, with a pappus that is 4-6.5mm long.

== Habitat ==
It is found in pastures, open woodlands, grasslands, suburban bushland, roadsides, disturbed sites, wastelands, parks and coastal environments in subtropical and warmer temperate regions.

== Toxicity ==
Senecio madagascariensis contains pyrrolizidine alkaloids and is poisonous. Horses, cattle, and other livestock are at risk.

Symptoms of poisoning from fireweed include gradual weight loss, jaundice, fluid in the lungs, blindness, sudden death without any other indications, aimless wandering, muscular coordination, twitching of the head muscles, abdominal straining, rectal prolapse, and irritability.

== Distribution ==
Native
Afrotropic:

Southern Africa: South Africa, eSwatini, and Lesotho, Madagascar, Botswana

Sources: GRIN

Introduced
Argentina, Australia, Colombia, Hawaii, Japan, Kenya, Mauritius, Mexico, New Zealand, and Réunion.
