= Església de Sant Serni de Llorts =

Church in Llorts, Andorra

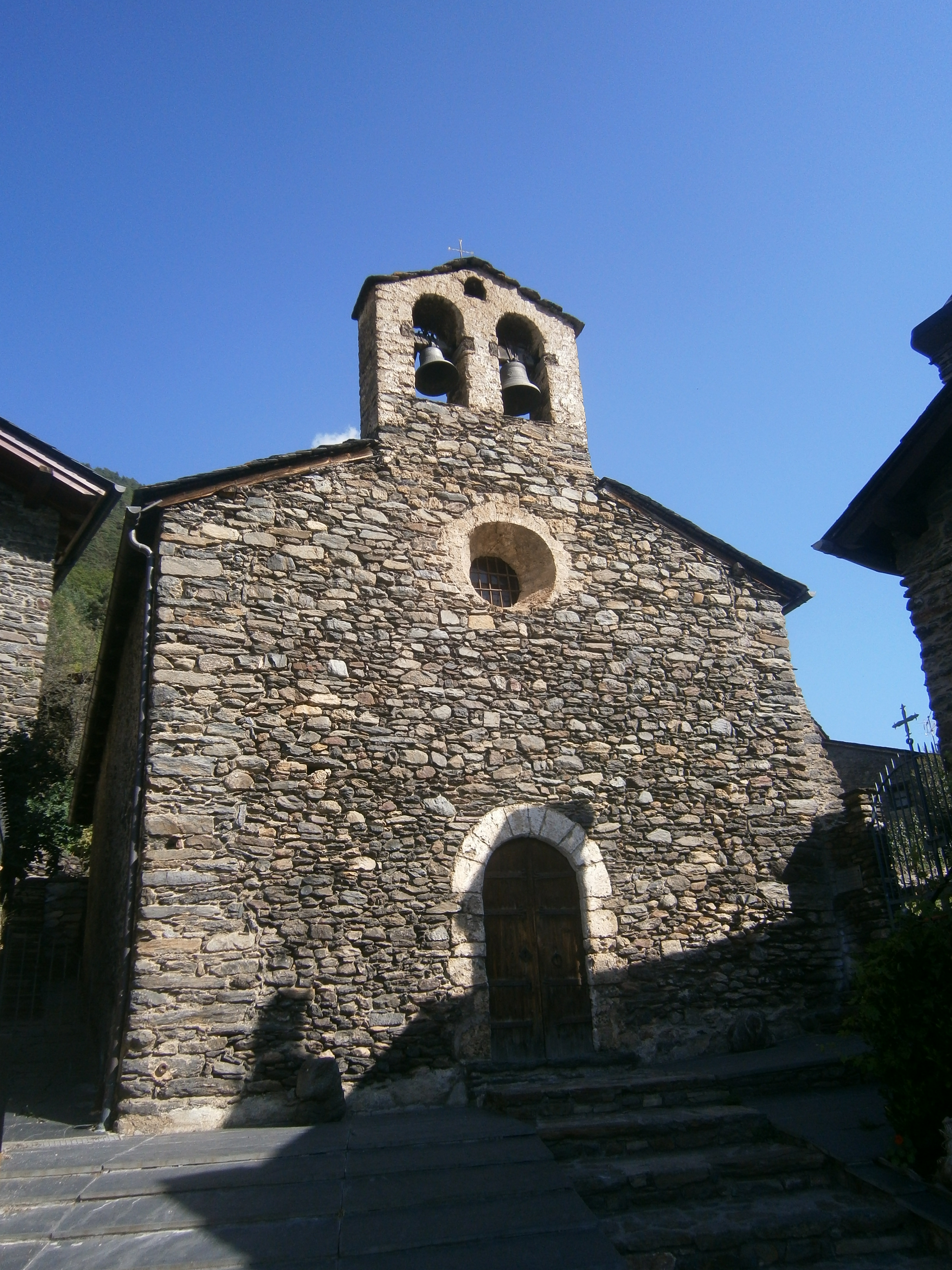
- Església de Sant Serni de Llorts
- 42.5964°N 1.5266°E
- Location: Llorts, Ordino, Andorra
- Country: Andorra
- Denomination: Catholic Church
- Sui iuris church: Latin Church

Església de Sant Serni de Llorts is a church located in Llorts, Ordino, Andorra, that was constructed in the 17th century using Romanesque and Baroque architecture and art. This church was constructed after the town's original church was destroyed by an avalanche. It was registered as a heritage property registered by the Cultural Heritage of Andorra on 16 July 2003.

== History ==
Església de Sant Serni de Llorts is located in Llorts, Ordino, Andorra. The previous church in Llorts, constructed sometime before the 12th century, was described as "primitive" by the Gran Enciclopèdia Catalana. According to Pere Canturri Montanya, this church was constructed after the town's previous church was destroyed. Local legends claim that the church was destroyed by an avalanche. The remnants of this previous church are still visible in Llorts.

The Cultural Heritage of Andorra listed the church as an asset of cultural interest on 16 July 2003. The protected zone around the church was delimited as 20 meters in 2018. In 2022, €8,254.44 were awarded for preventive maintenance and conservation of thirteen properties listed as assets of cultural interests, including Església de Sant Serni de Llorts.

== Structure ==
Constructed in the 17th century, the church uses a rectangular floor plan. The apse is separated from the nave by a triumphal arch. The sacristy is to the right of the nave. There is a Baroque altarpiece dedicated to Saturnin and two gable bell towers. Romanesque and Baroque architecture and art styling was used for the building.

== Works cited ==
=== News ===
- "L'amiant suspèn els treballs de restauració de Ràdio Andorra". ara. 29 August 2018.
- "Llum verda a l'entorn de protecció de l'església de Sant Serni de Llorts". ara. 31 January 2018. Archived from the original on 30 April 2025.
- "Patrimoni Cultural adjudica el cobriment de pissarra de tretze esglésies". Ara. 9 July 2022. Archived from the original on 19 July 2024.

=== Web ===
- "Església de Sant Serni de Llorts". Cultural Heritage of Andorra. Archived from the original on 9 May 2012.
- "Sant Serni de Llorts (Ordino)". Gran Enciclopèdia Catalana. Archived from the original on 9 November 2024.
