= Architecture of Andorra =

The architecture of Andorra demonstrates the varying styles of architecture in its over 800 years of existence.

Its architecture is shaped by that of its neighbours and is home to several, most notably Romanesque and Baroque while in more recent years, contemporary styles have been utilised especially between the rugged mountains of the Pyrenees.

== Architecture ==
Due to Andorra's nature being situated between France and Spain, a lot of its architecture was influenced by those countries. In particular, Romanesque style of architecture which is the most dominant style that is found in Andorra. The Romanesque period (at its height between the 11th and 12th Centuries), lasted for much longer in Andorra than in other European countries due to its isolation in the Pyrenees. Andorra is home to numerous churches, many dating from the 12th Century, as well as other historical buildings such as government buildings dating from the 16th Century and many houses dating from the 15th Century. The Andorra la Vella Historical District located in Andorra la Vella, the country's capital, is home to numerous buildings that range from being built in the 15th Century to the early 20th Century. Some notable buildings in the Old Town include:

Casa de la Vall - formerly housed the Andorran Parliament, the Consell General. Built in the late 16th Century, the house is now open to the public with guided tours.

Casa Guillemó, Molines and Cintet families - manors of various prominent Andorran families located on Plaça Príncep Benlloch.

== Churches ==
Andorra is famous for its historical churches found across the country. These churches are especially notable as they are perfectly preserved from the Romanesque period. Some notable churches include:

Sant Joan de Caselles Church - located in Canillo, it is a Romanesque church dating between the 11th to 12th Centuries.

Santa Coloma Church - located just outside Andorra la Vella in Santa Coloma and is the oldest church in Andorra.

Nostra Senyora de Meritxell Church - also located in Canillo, parts of the original church was destroyed by a fire in 1972 and subsequently, more contemporary elements were added to it.

Sant Esteve Church - this church is located in the Old Town of Andorra la Vella that was built in the 12th Century. Numerous changes and additions were made in the 20th Century.

Santa Eulalia Church - located in the village of Encamp, the church is built in the Romanesque style during the 11th Century.

== Gallery ==
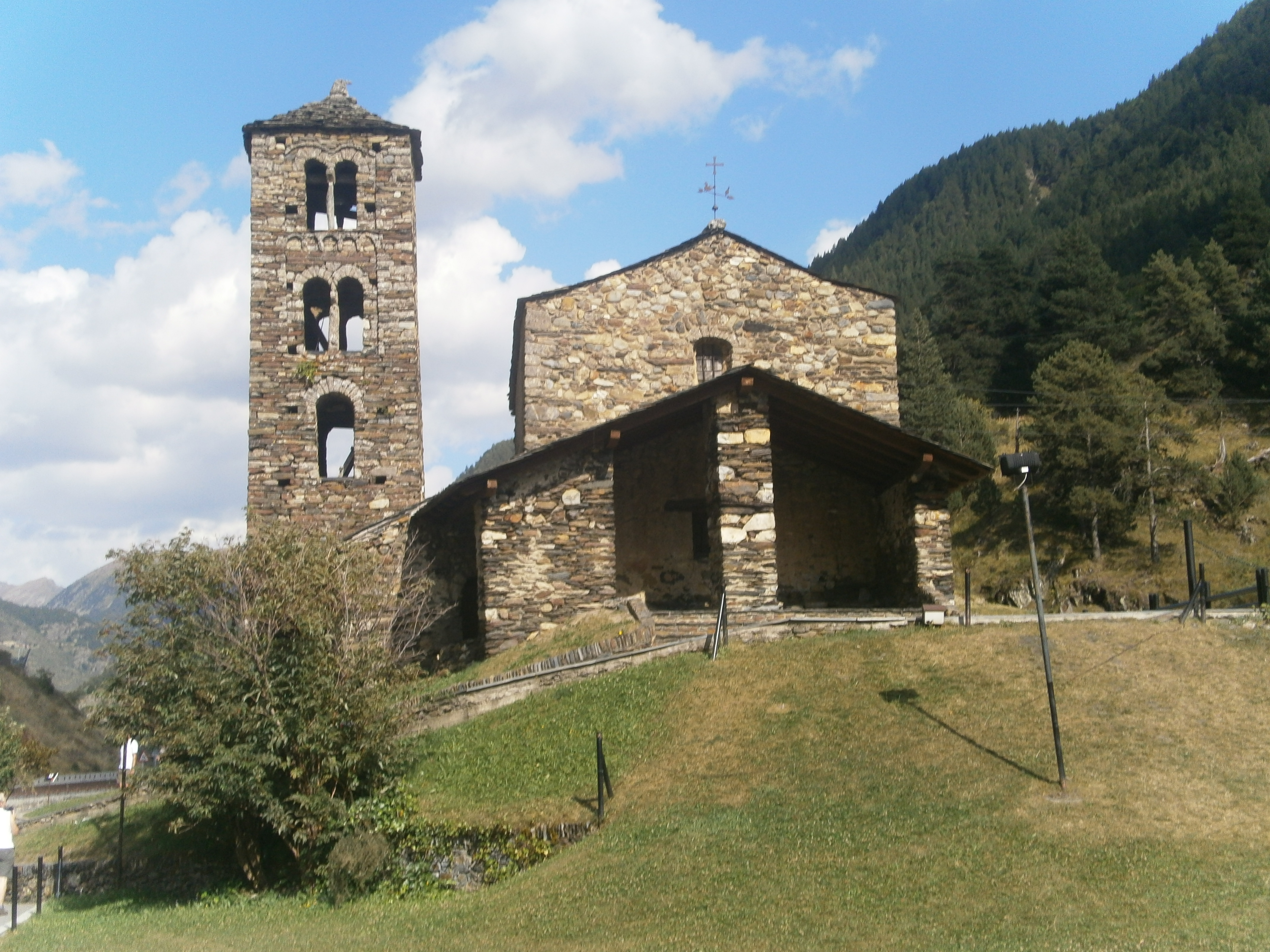
Sant Joan de Caselles Church

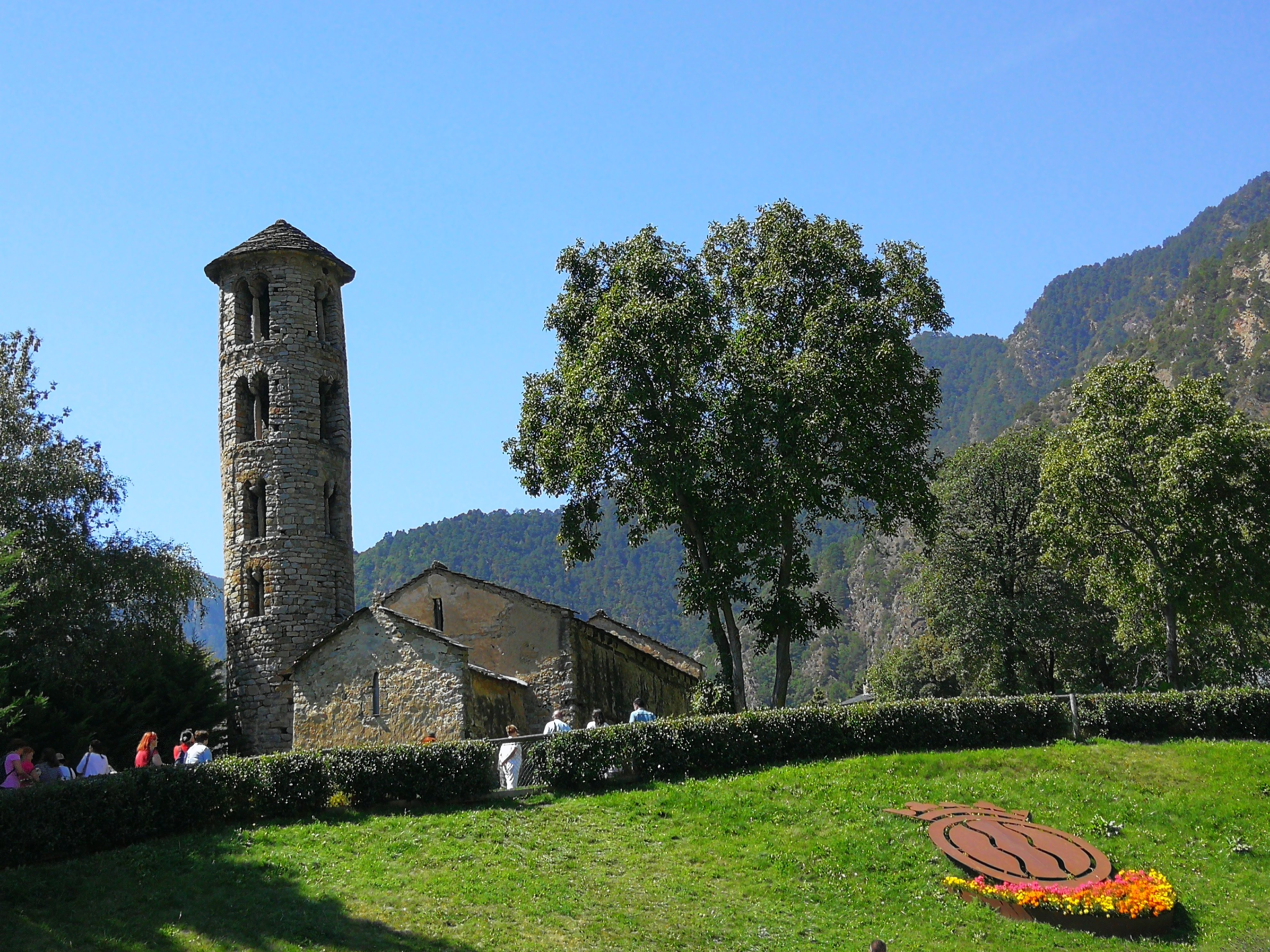
Santa Coloma Church

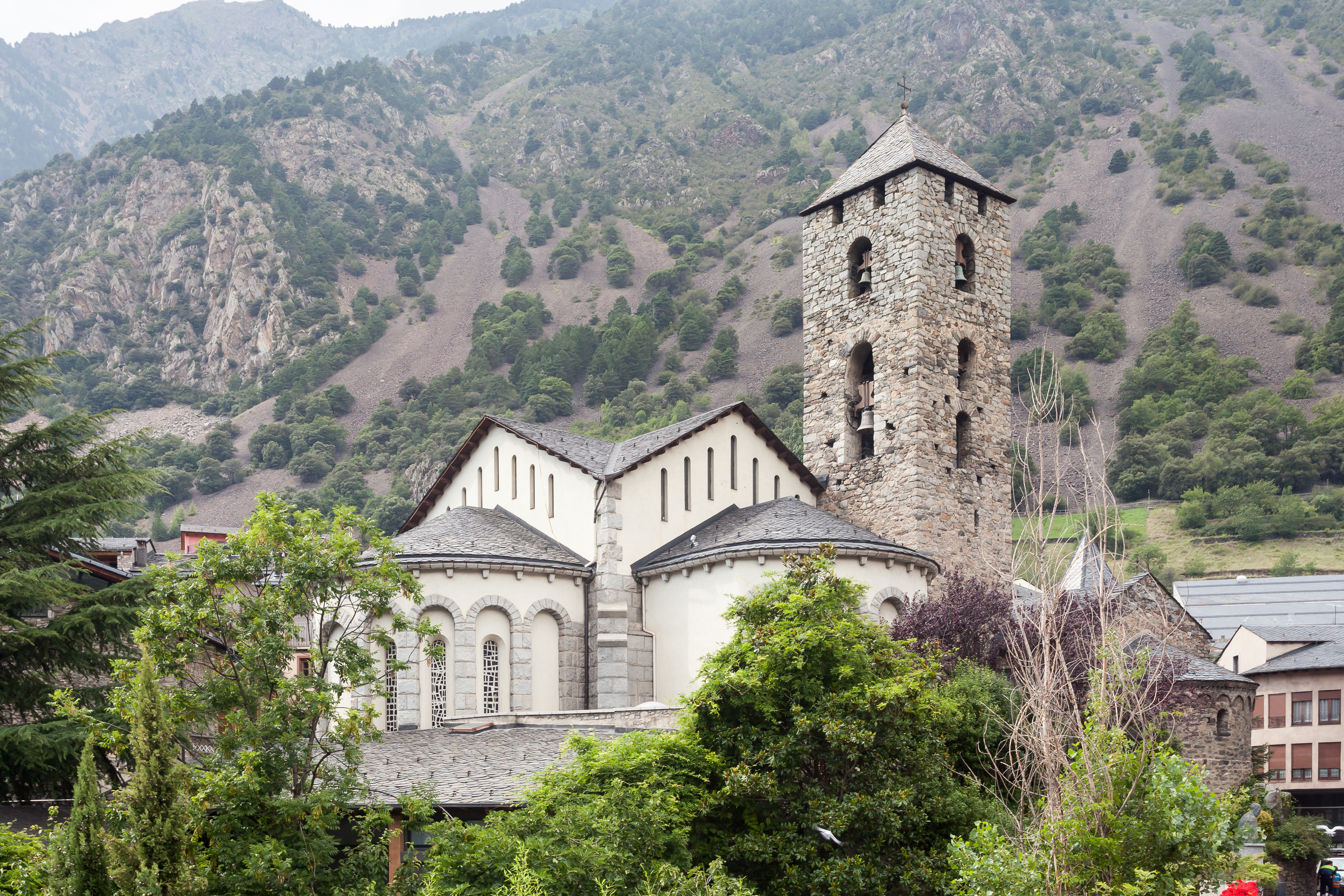
Sant Esteve Church

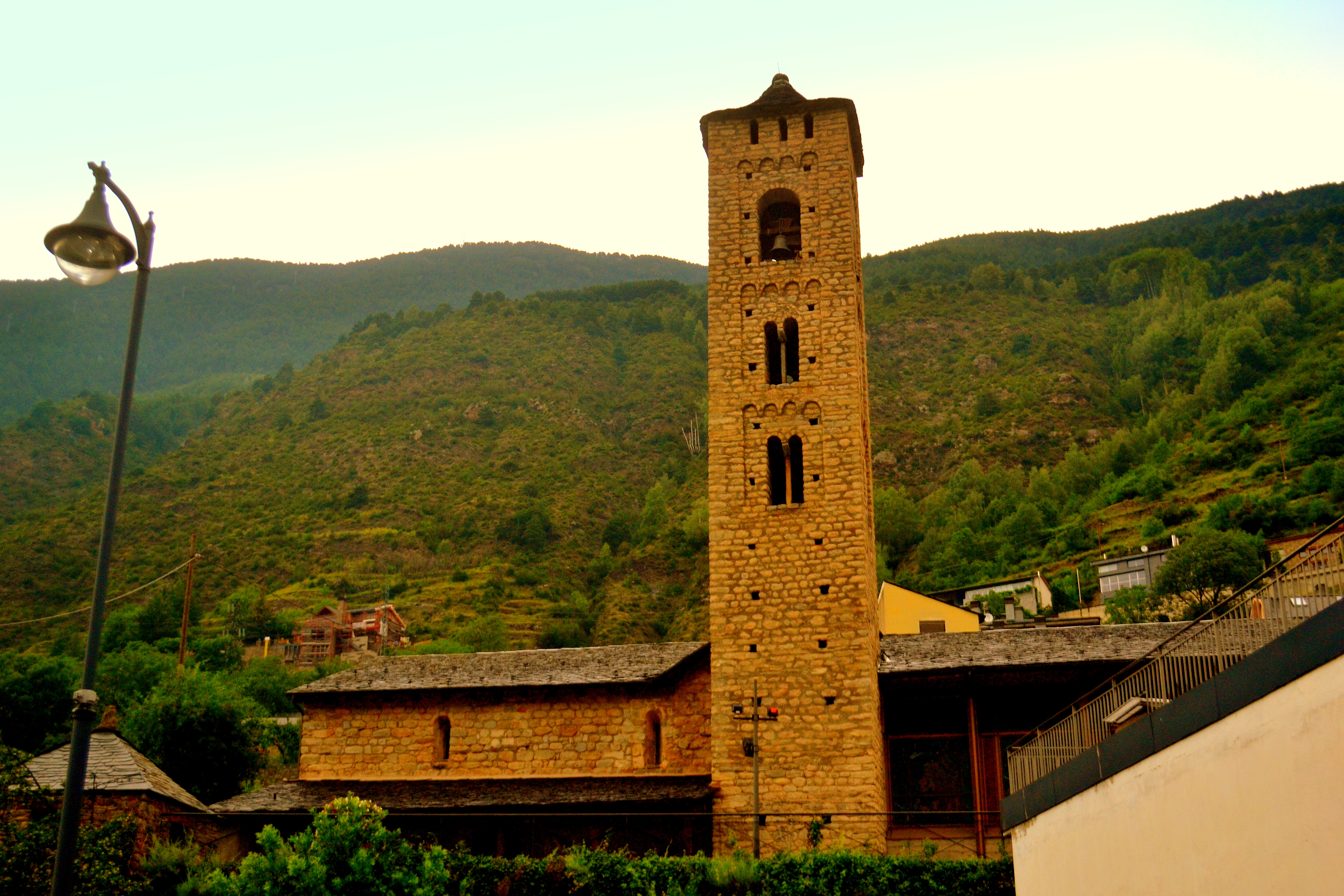
Santa Eulalia Church

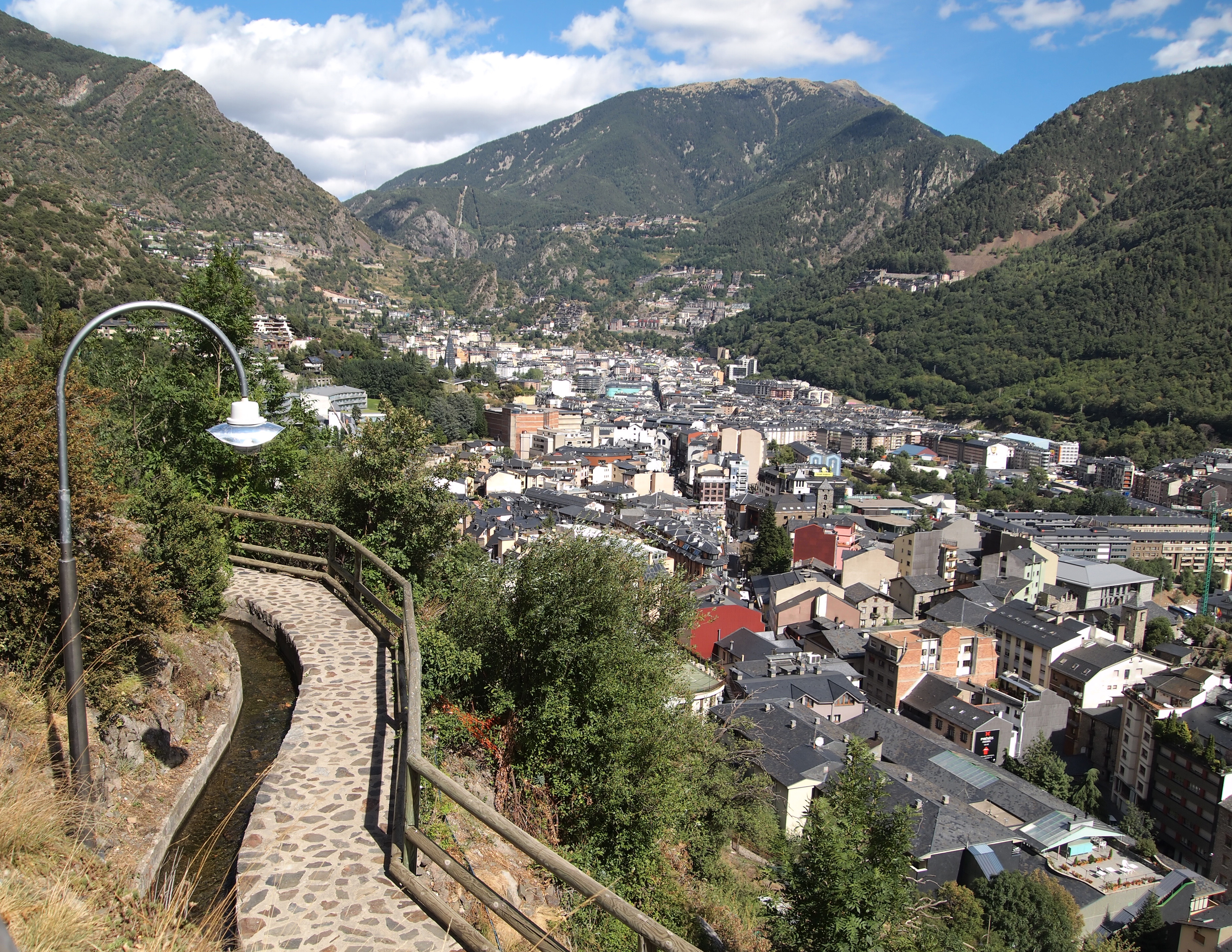
View of Andorra la Vella

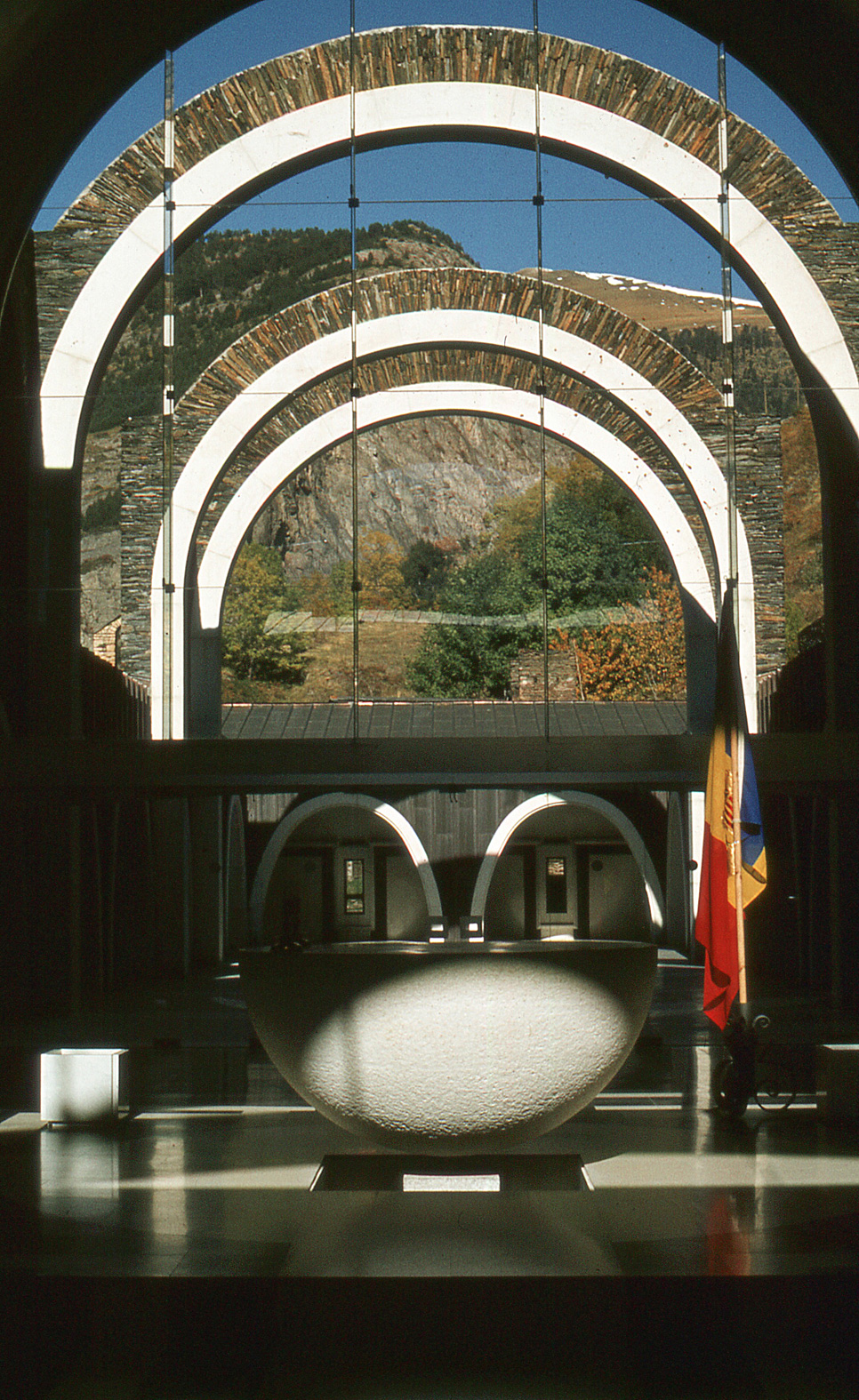
Nave view of the Santuario de Meritxell. Note the combination of newer fixtures and elements of the original Church.
