= Hotel Pyrénées =

Hotel in Andorra la Vella, Andorra

- Interactive map of the Hotel Pyrénées area

General information
- Location: Andorra la Vella, Andorra
- Coordinates: 42°30′26.7″N 1°31′10.7″E
- Opening: 1940

Other information
- Number of rooms: 70

Hotel Pyrénées is a four-star hotel in Andorra la Vella, Andorra. Built in 1940, Lonely Planet describes it as being "one of Andorra's few venerable buildings" and containing "haunting old photographs of Andorra in its restaurant". It originally went under the Catalan name "Pirinec" and had 36 rooms but today it has 70 rooms.
