= El Serrat =

- Village
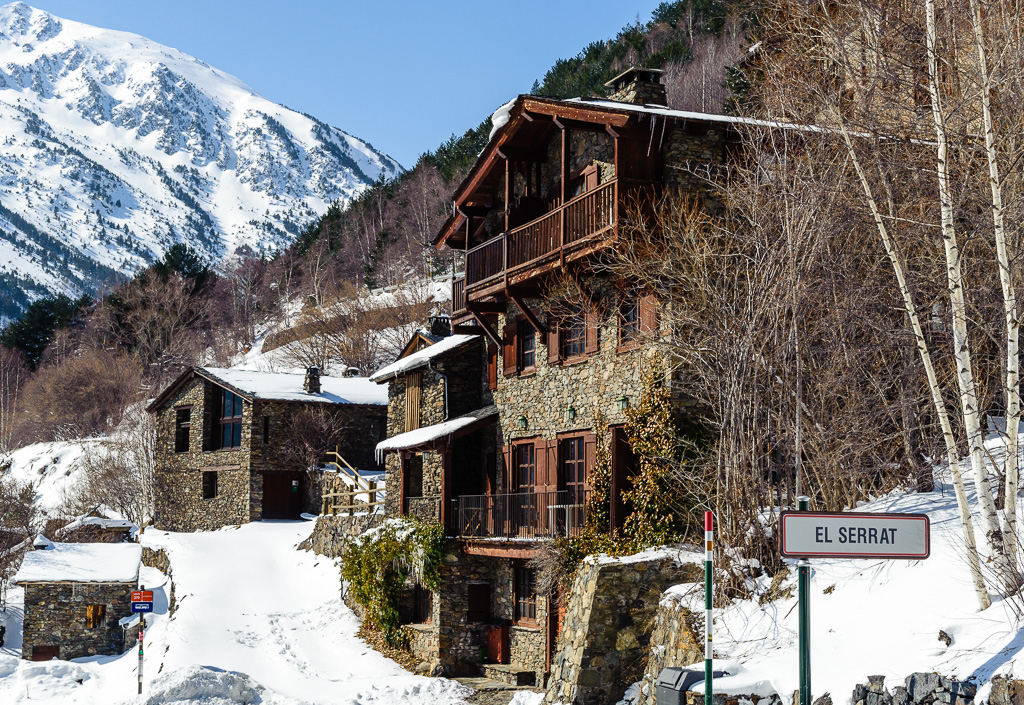
- View of Village

- Location in Andorra
- Coordinates: 42°37′N 1°33′E
- Country: Andorra
- Parish: Ordino
- Elevation: 1,540 m (5,050 ft)

Population (2009)
  - Total: 138
- Postal code: AD300

El Serrat (Catalan pronunciation: [el seˈrat]) is a mountain village in the parish of Ordino, Andorra. It is at an elevation of 1,540 metres (5,100 ft). It is a popular destination for skiers.

== Geography ==
El Serrat is near the source of the northern branch of the Rio Valira.

== Flora ==
Many different types of wild flowers grow in the El Serrat area.

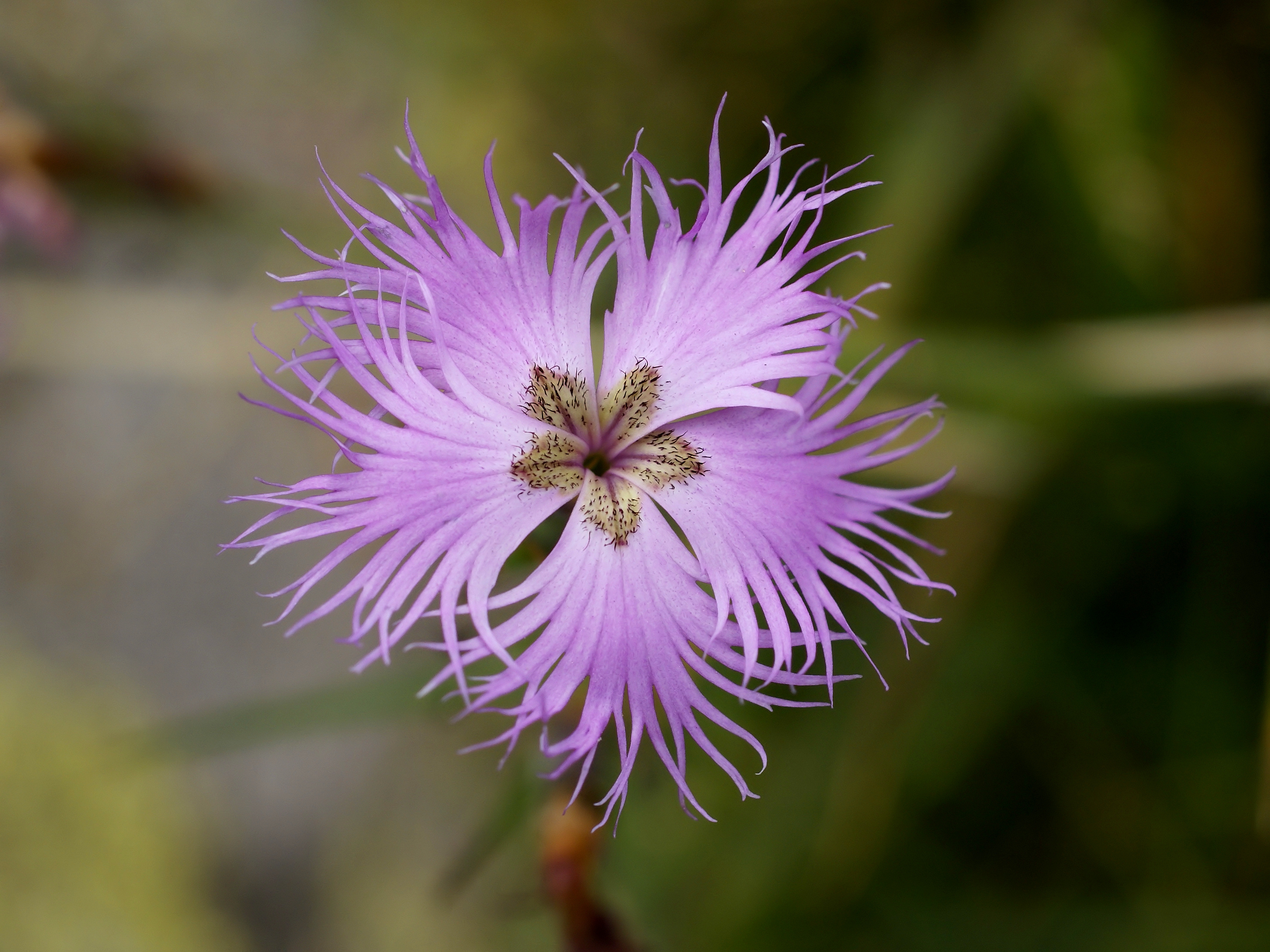
Dianthus monspessulanus

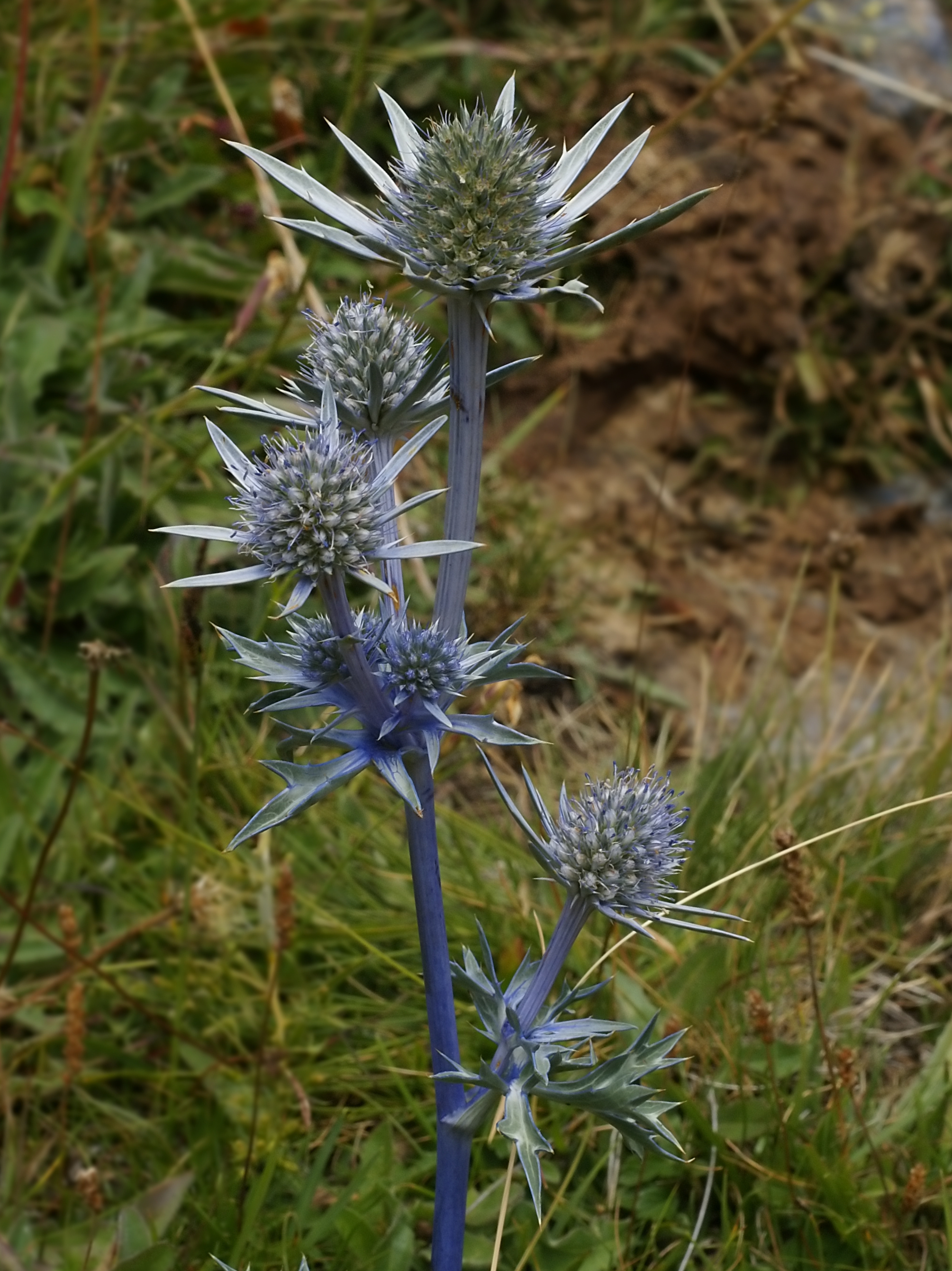
Mediterranean Sea Holly, Eryngium bourgatii

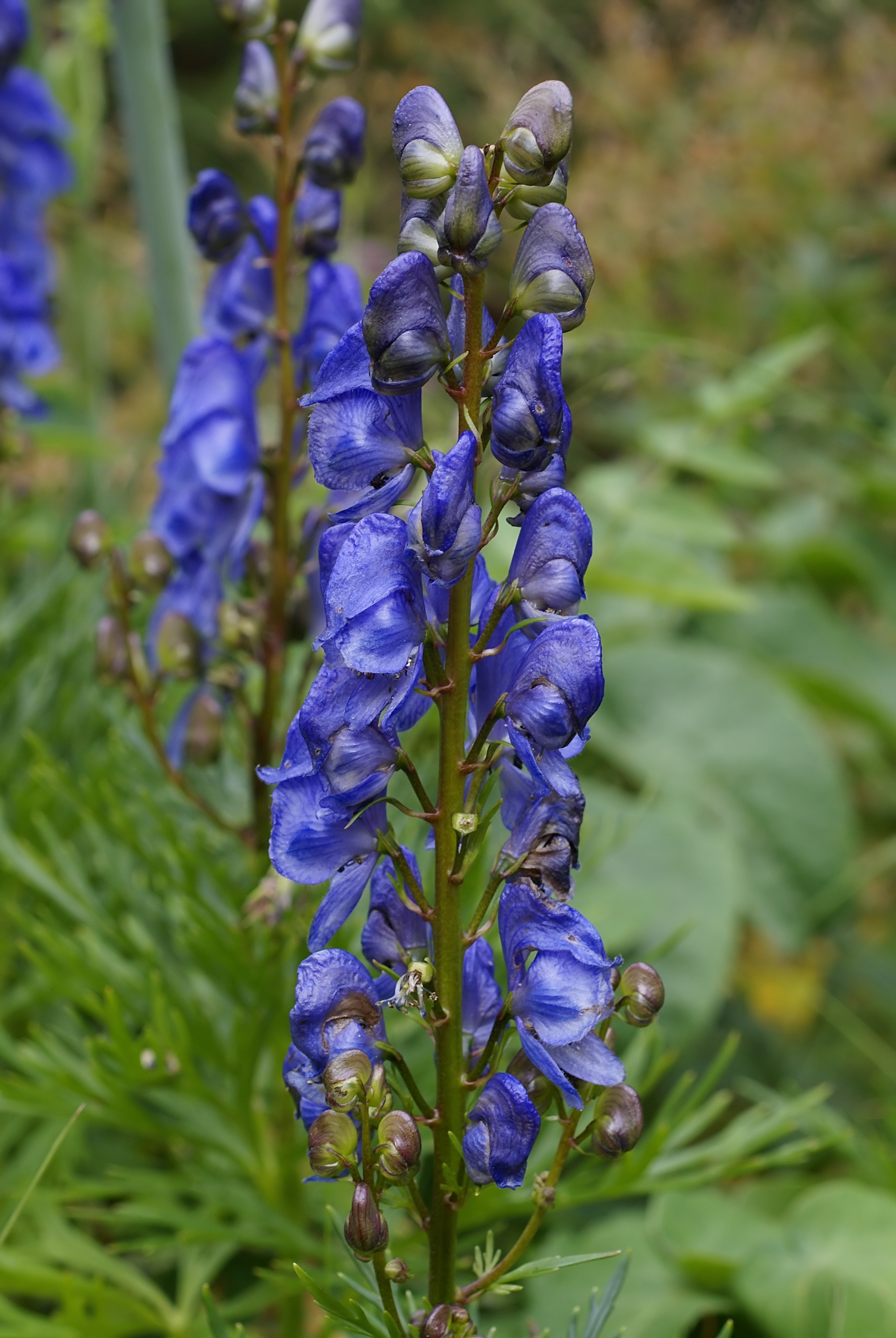
Monkshood Aconitum napellus subsp. vulgare

== See also ==
- Flora of Andorra
