= Hotel Bellavista =

Building in Andorra la Vella, Andorra

Coordinates: 42.5078°N 1.5245°E

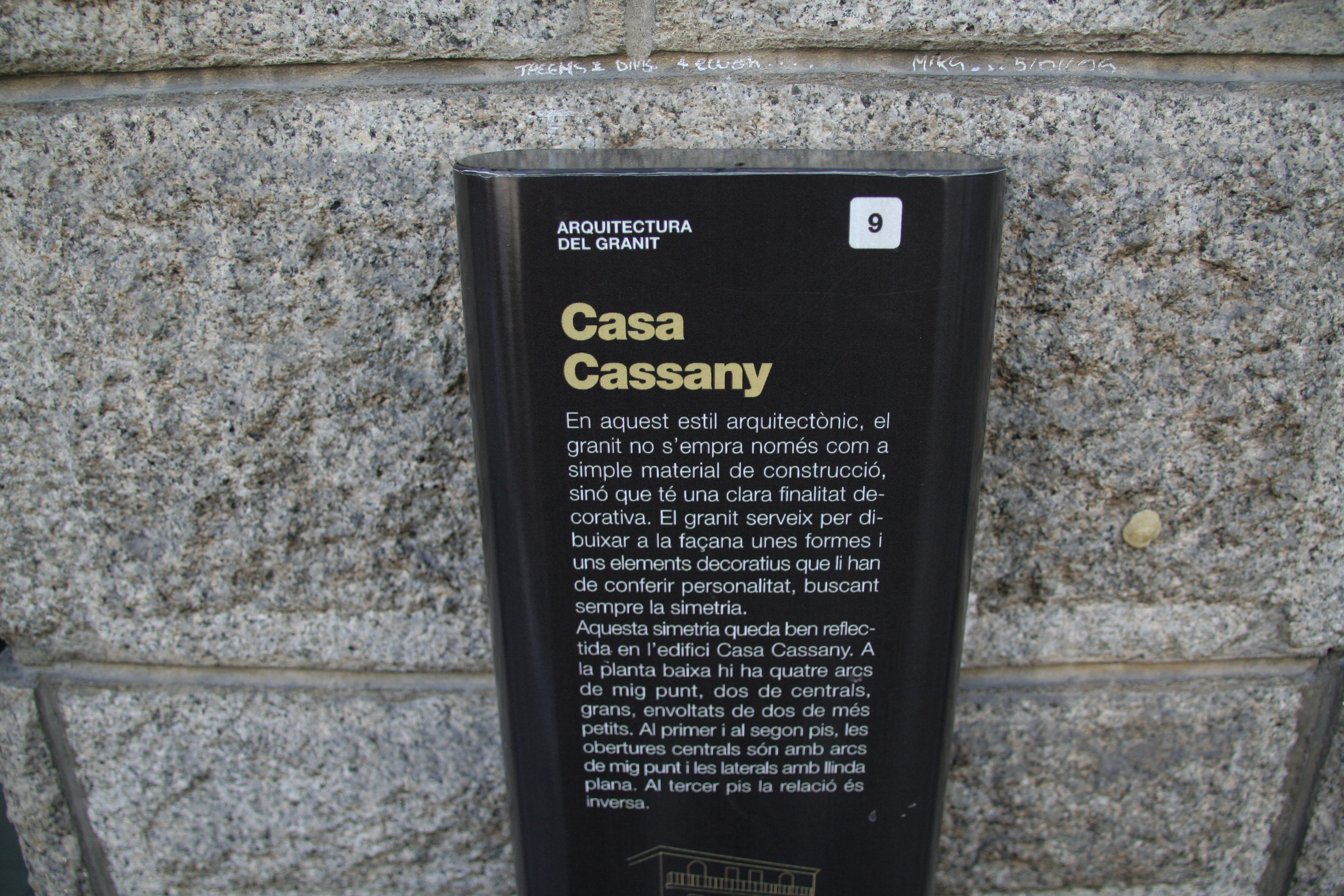
Hotel Bellavista

Hotel Bellavista is a former hotel located at Avinguda Meritxell, 26 in Andorra la Vella, Andorra. It is a heritage property registered in the Cultural Heritage of Andorra. It was built in 1938–40. There is a currently a Pizza Hut on the ground floor.

The facade of the former hotel was listed 7 July 2004 on the General Inventory of Cultural Heritage of Andorra, with inventory registration number 032 / BI / I / 04.
