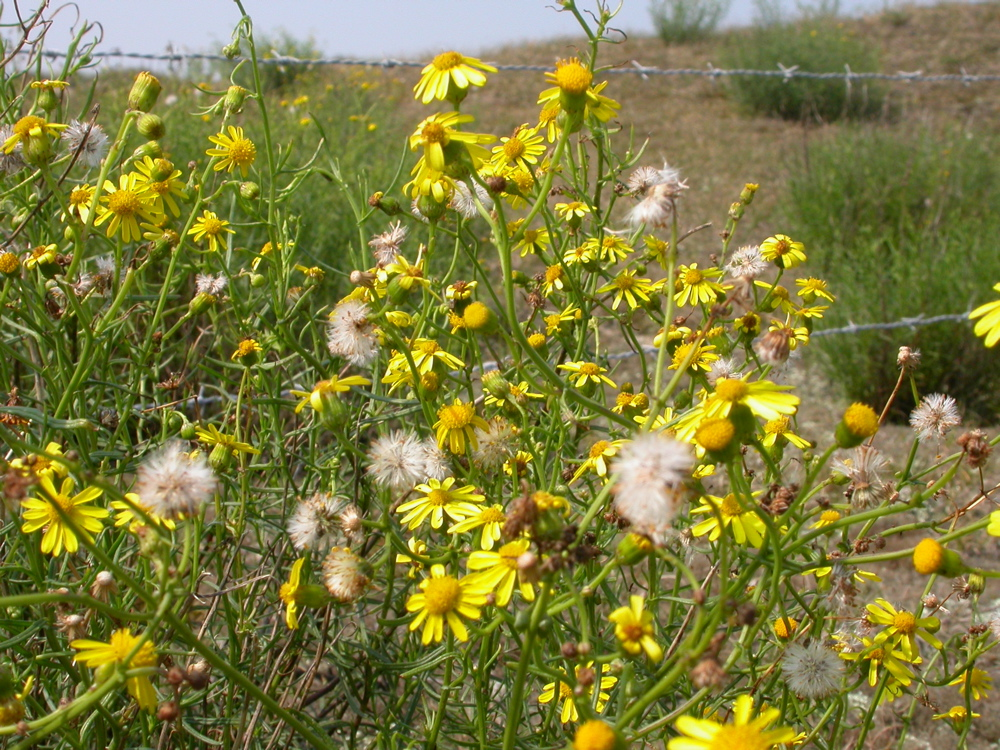

Scientific classification
- Kingdom: Plantae
- Clade: Tracheophytes
- Clade: Angiosperms
- Clade: Eudicots
- Clade: Asterids
- Order: Asterales
- Family: Asteraceae
- Genus: Senecio
- Species: S. inaequidens

Binomial name
- Senecio inaequidens DC. (1838 )

Synonyms
- Senecio madagascarensis, Senecio harveianus Sources: CABI, IPNI, AFPD

= Senecio inaequidens =

Species of flowering plant in the daisy family

Senecio inaequidens, known as narrow-leaved ragwort and South African ragwort, is a species of flowering plant in the daisy family Asteraceae.

== Description ==
Senecio inaequidens is a perennial chamaephyte up to 1 m (3 ft 3 in) in height, often much ramified, with each stem ending in one or a few capitula yellow in colour, forming a loose floral display. A single plant produces 26 to 500 capitula each year, with approximately 90 florets, 74% of them developing a viable achene. The leaves are linear, entire or almost so and without petioles.

S. inaequidens exists as a diploid genotype and a tetraploid cytotype. Initially the diploid S. madagascarensis and S. harveianus were assumed to be different species; however molecular analysis showed that they only differ in cytotype.

== Distribution ==
It is native to Southern Africa, including Lesotho, South Africa, Eswatini, Namibia, Mozambique and Botswana.

=== Habitat ===
In its native habitat S. inaequidens occurs at elevations from sea level to 2,850 m in a wide range of naturally or anthropogenically disturbed habitats such as river banks, rocky slopes, heavily grazed or recently burned grasslands, and road verges. The tetraploid cytotype was only found in the uKhalhamba and Maloti mountain ranges, and this is the cytotype of S. inaequidens which was inadvertently exported to Europe.

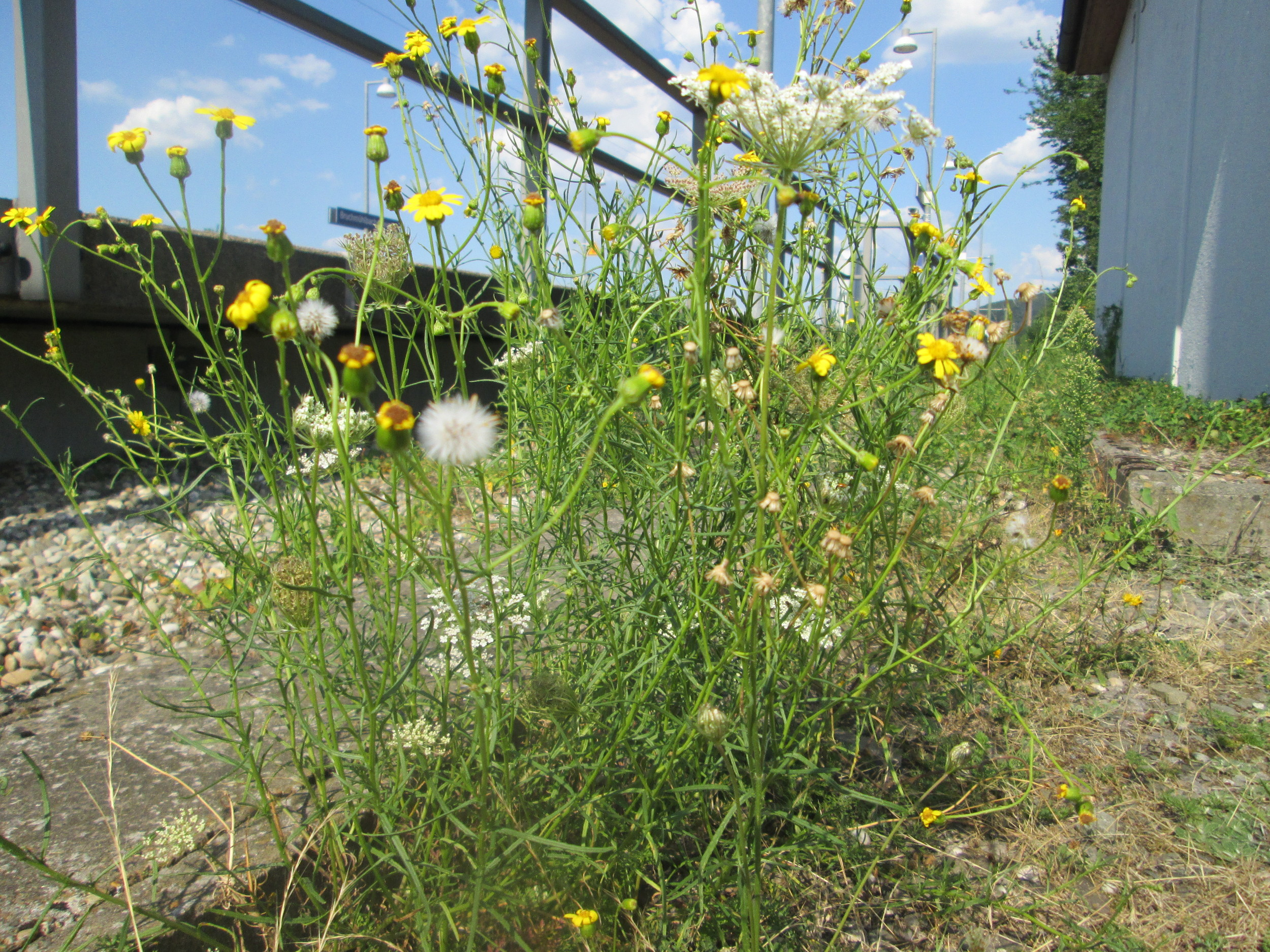
S. inaequidens is mostly found along railways and motorways.

=== Invasive spread ===
The plant is a widespread neophyte in Europe and an invasive species in Central Europe. It was introduced through wool imports from Southern Africa. In Europe the ports of entry were Bremen, Calais, Mazamet, and Verviers.

S. inaequidens commonly exists in ruderal habitats such as railroads, roads and motorways, vacant or disused land. Plants can be seen on disused land as pioneer species but so far often disappear in an ecological succession. In Central Europe where it first spread, the plant so far seems to use previously unused ecological niches. There does not seem a clear advantage over native vegetation, except in higher altitude. In the European Alps ecologists and farmers are worried that it has the advantage of invading grazing fields on the alm pastures. The furthest north it was found was Norway. S. inaequidens is also present in Korea and Taiwan.

In South America and Australia the diploid variant S. madagascariensis is highly invasive.

== Properties ==
Senecio inaequidens contains pyrrolizidine alkaloids having hepatotoxic properties that are poisonous to mammals.
