= Sport Hotel =

Hotel in Soldeu, Andorra

- Interactive map of the Sport Hotel area

General information
- Location: Soldeu, Andorra
- Coordinates: 42°34′34″N 1°40′11″E
- Opening: 1987

Other information
- Number of rooms: 148

Sport Hotel is a four-star resort hotel in Soldeu, Andorra. It has 148 rooms. Originally established as a resort village in 1972, Sport Hotel became Soldeu's first 4-star hotel when it opened in 1987.
