= Pont de la Margineda =

Bridge in Andorra

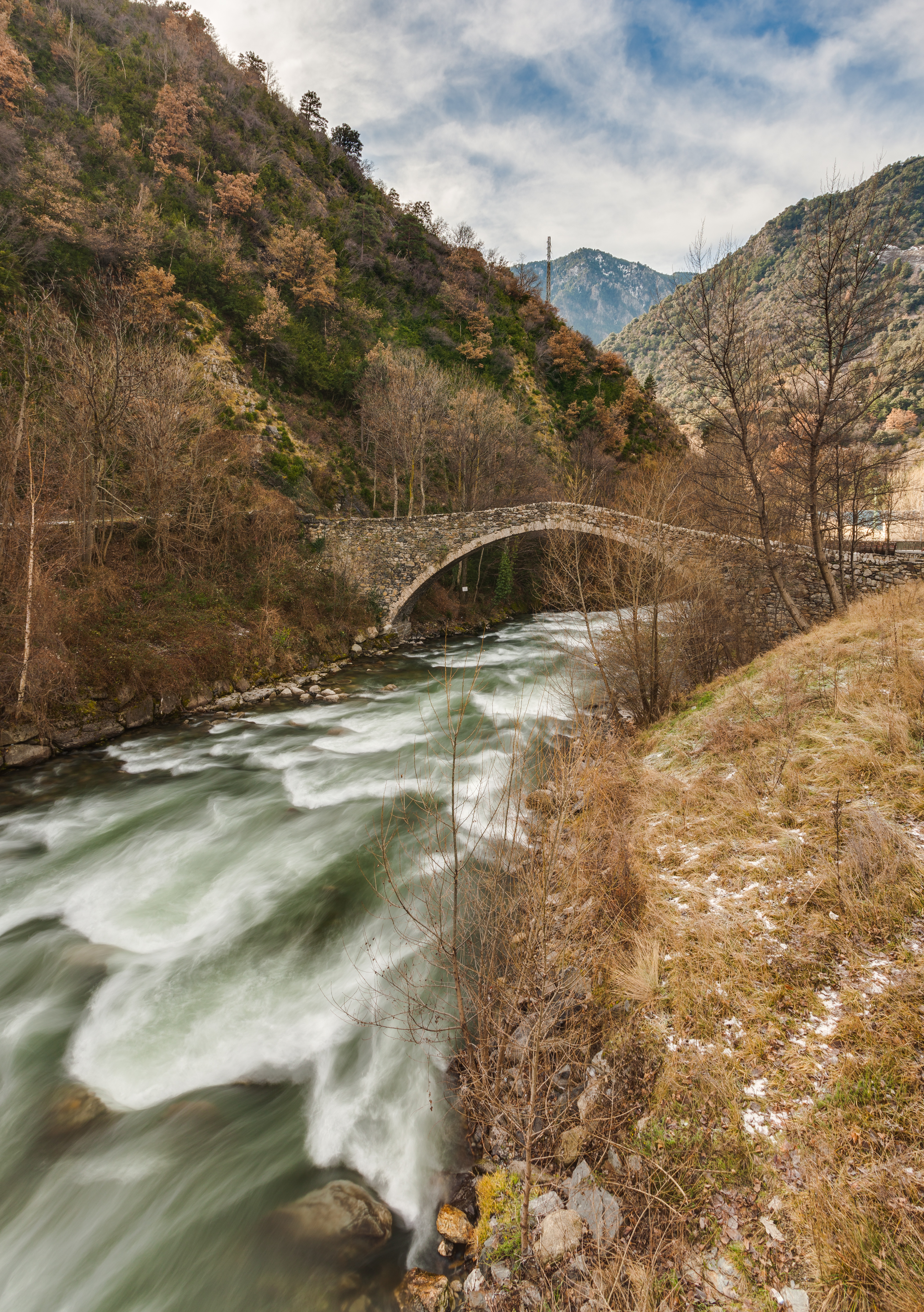
- Coordinates: 42°29′03″N 1°29′31″E

Characteristics
- Material: Pumice (archstones); Granite (walls)

Pont de la Margineda (Catalan pronunciation: [ˈpɔn de la maɾ(d)ʒiˈneða]) is a bridge located in Santa Coloma, Andorra la Vella Parish, Andorra. It is a heritage property registered in the Cultural Heritage of Andorra. It was built in the 14-15th century. The bridge spans a river called the Gran Valira. The archstones are pumice, to keep the structure light. The walls are made of granite.

== See also ==
- La Margineda
