= Hostal Palanques =

Hostel in Avinguda Sant Antoni, Andorra

Coordinates: 42°32′45″N 01°30′52″E

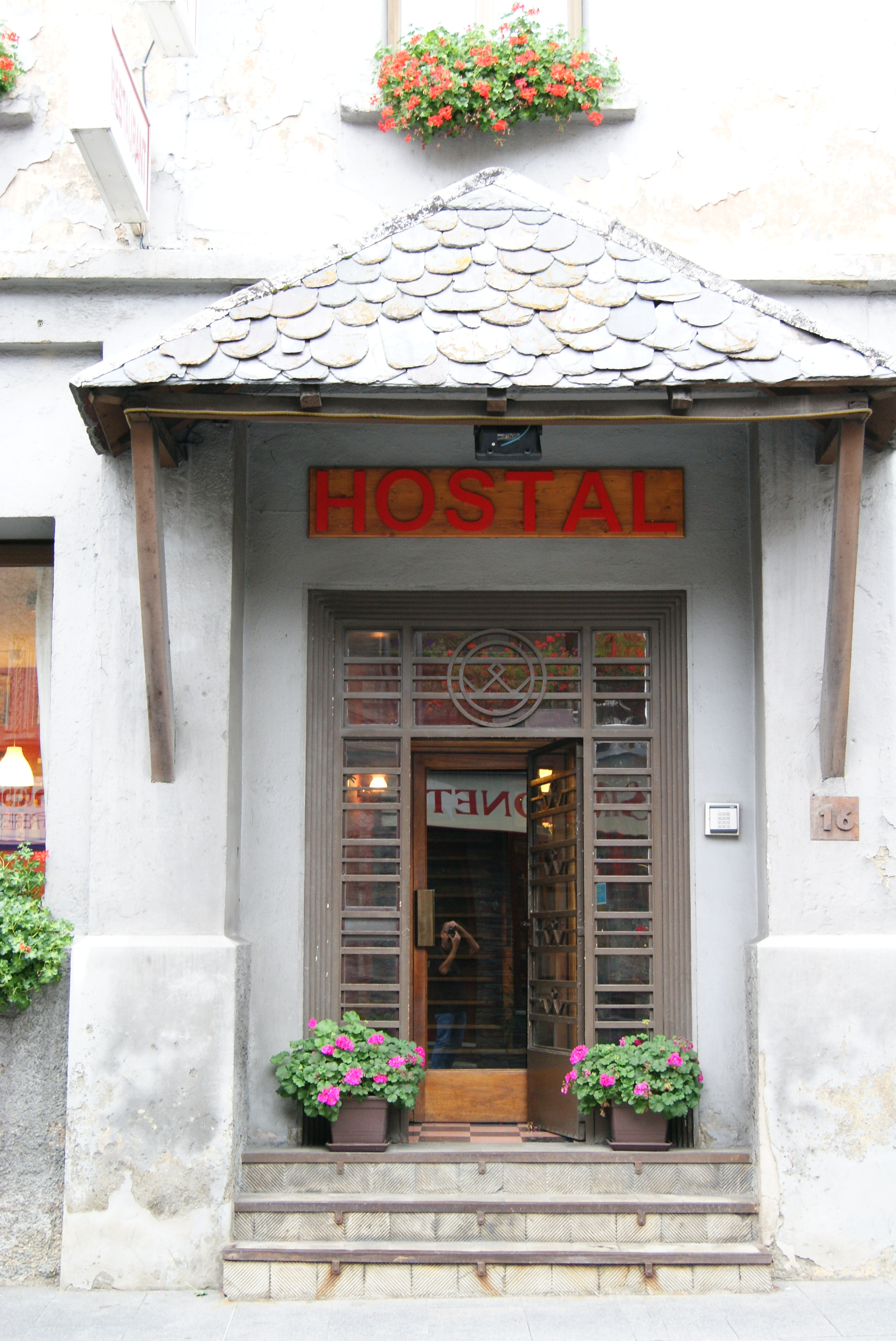

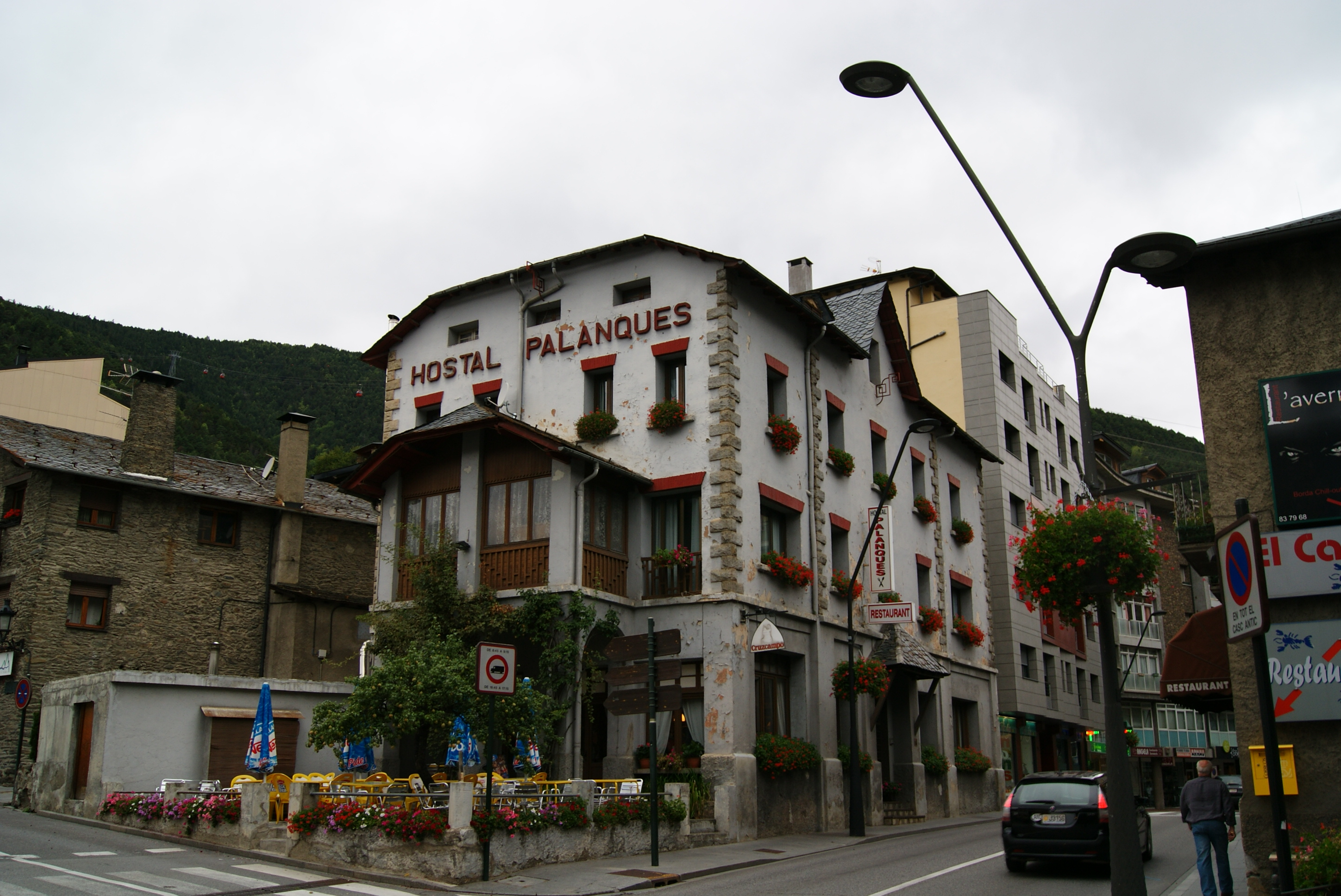
Hostal Palanques

Hostal Palanques is a hostal located at Avinguda Sant Antoni, 16 in La Massana Parish, Andorra. It is a heritage property registered in the Cultural Heritage of Andorra. It was built in 1933–35.
