= Gran Valira =

River in Andorra

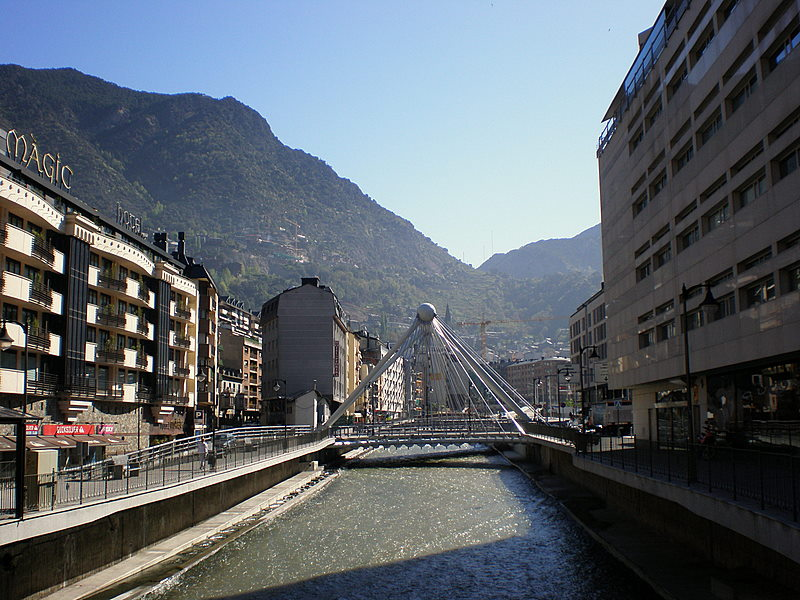
- Gran Valira flowing under the Pont de Paris in Andorra la Vella

Location
- Country: Andorra
- City: Andorra la Vella

Physical characteristics
- Source confluence: Valira d'Orient & Valira del Nord
  - location: Escaldes-Engordany, Andorra
  - coordinates: 42.5116°N 1.5357°E
- Mouth
  - location: La Seu d'Urgell, Spain
  - coordinates: 42.3458°N 1.4425°E
- Length: 35 km (22 mi)
- Basin size: 592 km^{2} (229 sq mi)
- Discharge
  - average: 9.5 m^{3}/s (340 cu ft/s)

Basin features
- Progression: Segre→ Ebro→ Balearic Sea
- Tributaries
  - left: Valira d'Orient, Madriu
  - right: Valira del Nord

Gran Valira (Catalan pronunciation: [ˈɡram baˈliɾa]), also known as the Valira, is the largest river in Andorra in the Pyrenees that drains most of Andorra and enters the Segre in Catalonia, Spain. It is formed by the confluence of the Valira d'Orient and Valira del Nord near Escaldes-Engordany and Andorra la Vella.

The river's Andorran valley includes the capital, Andorra la Vella, and Sant Julià de Lòria. The concentration of settlements in the narrow valley contributes to flood exposure. Urbanisation and tourism have affected river ecology, while the expansion of sewage collection and treatment has improved water quality.

== Course and drainage basin ==
The Valira d'Orient rises in the Pessons cirque and flows through Soldeu, Canillo and Encamp. The Madriu joins it near Les Escaldes, upstream of the confluence with the Valira del Nord. The northern headstream collects water from the Tristaina, Rialb and Sorteny systems and other tributaries in northern Andorra.

Below the confluence, tributaries include the Riu d'Enclar and Riu d'Os on the right and the Runer on the left. The Riu d'Os passes through Spanish territory before joining the Valira upstream of Sant Julià de Lòria. The Runer follows part of the international boundary. Its junction with the Valira marks Andorra's lowest point, at approximately 838 metres (2,749 ft) above sea level.

In Spain, the river crosses Alt Urgell and joins the Segre downstream of La Seu d'Urgell and Castellciutat. Through the Segre, it forms part of the Ebro drainage basin.

The Valira system, including its eastern headstream, is approximately 44 kilometres (27 mi) long and has a drainage basin of about 562 square kilometres (217 sq mi). (Note: Gran Enciclopèdia Catalana gives a total length of 41.4 kilometres (25.7 mi), including 9 kilometres (5.6 mi) outside Andorra.)

== Geological history ==
The Valira valleys contain evidence of repeated Quaternary glaciation. Glaciers occupying the northern and eastern valleys converged to form the main Valira glacier, which extended beyond Sant Julià de Lòria. The tributary glaciers crossed metamorphic rocks, including slate and gneiss, and valleys with granite bedrock. Terminal-moraine complexes survive at Cal Tolse, Sant Julià de Lòria, La Margineda and Santa Coloma; several record renewed advances during a broader process of glacier retreat.

Glacial ice also obstructed drainage from tributary valleys. A former lake at La Massana developed where the Valira d'Orient glacier blocked meltwater from the northern valley; the lake subsequently filled with sediment. Deposits associated with this lake are among the best-preserved glacial sedimentary sequences studied in Andorra.

== Hydrology ==
The river's flow combines snowmelt and rainfall, with a spring–early summer maximum, winter and late-summer minima, and a smaller autumn rise.

The Spanish gauging station at La Seu d'Urgell measures discharge from an upstream catchment of 559 square kilometres (216 sq mi). The Anuario de Aforos 2020–2021 reports a mean annual discharge of 9.73 m^{3}/s (344 cu ft/s) for the available annual records spanning 1912–2020. Monthly averages were highest in May and June, at approximately 27.2 and 25.2 m^{3}/s respectively, and fell to approximately 4.1 m^{3}/s in September. The published series contains incomplete years, and the yearbook cautions that changes to gauging stations and channels can affect the comparability of observations.

== Flooding ==
Destructive floods occurred in October 1937 and November 1982. A regional study covering 1981–2015 identified the concentration of settlements around the Valira as an important contributor to Andorra's flood risk. Within the country, the largest numbers of recorded flood events occurred in the municipalities of Andorra la Vella and Sant Julià de Lòria, with 27 and 18 respectively. These figures cover flooding within the municipalities, rather than exclusively overflows of the main river.

The November 1982 disaster formed part of a prolonged rainfall episode affecting the eastern Pyrenees between 6 and 8 November. A retrospective study recorded 13 fatalities in Andorra and extensive damage to roads, buildings and other infrastructure. Its meteorological analysis identified sustained moist southerly airflow and uplift over the mountains as central mechanisms maintaining the rainfall. The study also associated the severity of the impacts with rapid urban expansion during the 1970s and insufficient land-use planning, which had increased the exposure of buildings, infrastructure and inhabitants.

== Ecology and water quality ==
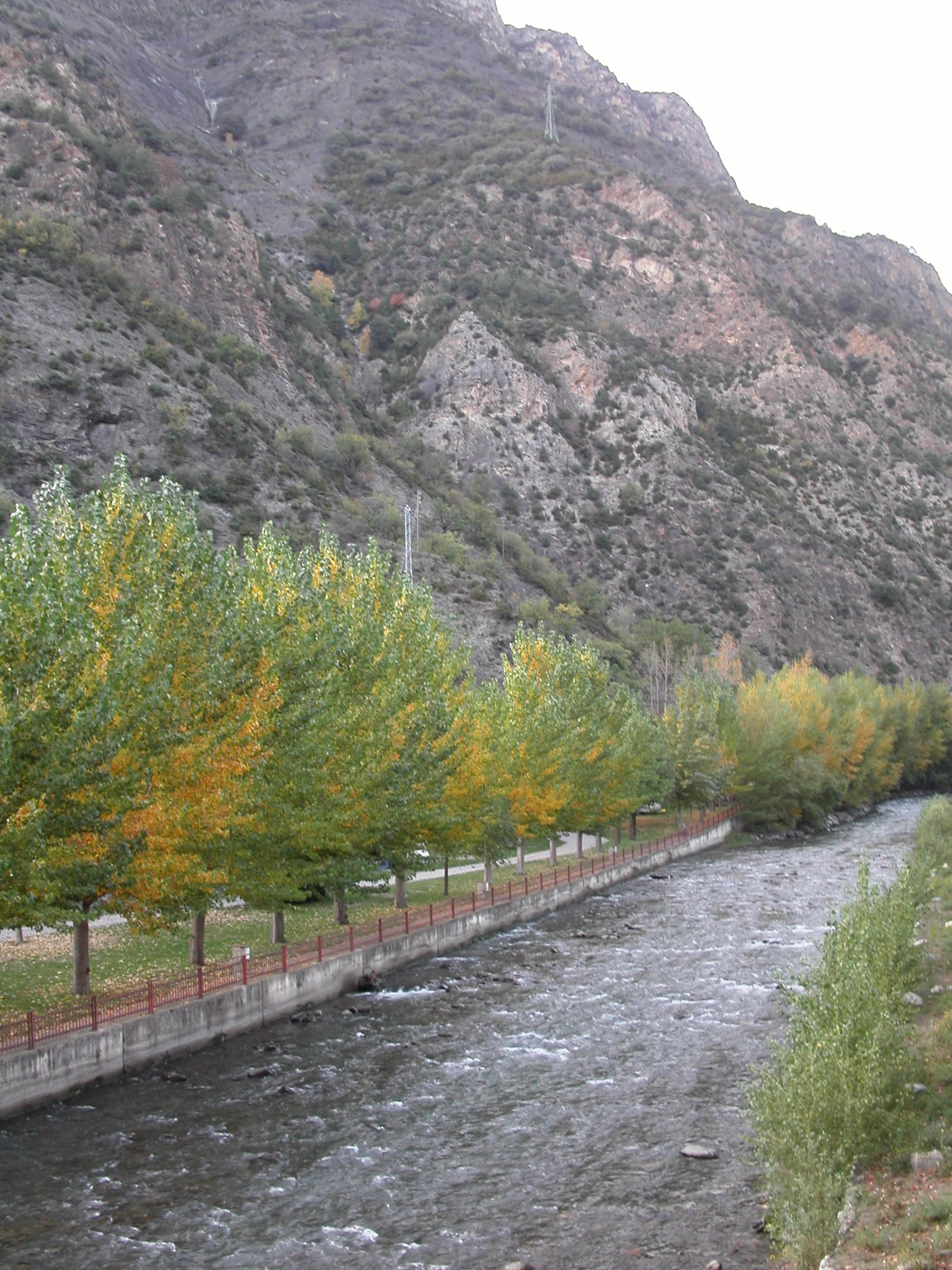
Gran Valira flowing through Sant Julià de Lòria

=== River habitats ===
A government-commissioned survey in 2017 documented extensive modification of the Gran Valira's banks through channelisation, infrastructure construction and occupation of the floodplain. Willow and poplar vegetation predominated among the remaining wooded riverbanks, while smaller patches of alder and ash woodland survived between La Margineda and the Spanish border. Some previously disturbed banks had been recolonised by vegetation or restored through planting.

The survey recorded the invasive plants Buddleja davidii, Impatiens balfourii and Senecio inaequidens along the river. It also identified weirs and paved sections of the bed as obstacles to fish movement and factors reducing habitat diversity; fish passes had been installed at some obstructed locations.

=== Pollution and treatment ===
Research published in 2005, based on sampling in 1998–1999, found that the chemical and biological condition of Andorran streams generally deteriorated downstream. On the Gran Valira, the border sampling site had poor biological quality throughout the study, while La Margineda showed seasonal variation. The most affected invertebrate communities had reduced diversity and were dominated by pollution-tolerant organisms. The researchers associated these conditions with wastewater from settlements and seasonal tourism, together with sediment disturbance from construction. Low flows in winter and summer increased pollutant concentrations, whereas snowmelt helped dilute pollution and transport contaminated sediment downstream.

Sanitation of the Valira basin was addressed by a bilateral agreement with Spain in 1989 and an Andorran sanitation plan introduced in 1996. The programme expanded wastewater collectors and treatment plants. In 2013, the environment department reported that water quality at La Margineda had reached the official good category in 2012 for the first time since the plan began. Further work included identifying sewer connections that mixed clean water with wastewater and reduced treatment efficiency.

The government's assessment for 2025, published in March 2026, classified the Gran Valira's overall physicochemical water quality as good. It nevertheless recorded lower ratings at the Sant Julià de Lòria monitoring point and downstream of the southern wastewater treatment plant. At the latter station, the report associated nitrogen and phosphorus indicators with limited dilution of treated effluent. The station immediately upstream of the plant improved to the good category.

== Human use and management ==
The Pont de la Margineda carried the historic road between Sant Julià de Lòria and Andorra la Vella across the river. The surviving stone bridge dates to the fourteenth or fifteenth century. Documentary research accompanying its restoration identified a reference to a new bridge at the location in 1487. The crossing enabled the road to change from the river's left bank to its right bank.

Water from the upper catchment is used for hydroelectricity generation. A subterranean canal diverts water from the Valira d'Orient at Ransol towards Lake Engolasters. The hydroelectric system also receives water diverted at Ràmio. Engolasters is a natural lake whose storage capacity has been increased by a dam; water is released through a penstock to regulate generation at the hydroelectric plant.

Water-resource planning has included the WEAP-Andorra model, which represents water supply and demand within the Andorran portion of the Valira basin. Its scenarios consider changes in population, tourism, consumption, temperature, ecological-flow requirements and drought. A modelling study published in 2026 projected lower annual streamflow by 2050 under combined climatic and socioeconomic change scenarios. It found that overall water demand could generally be met, but that extreme drought could constrain snowmaking and hydroelectric generation, with the severity of shortages depending on drought frequency and duration.
