= April 5 =

April 5 this year in various calendars
- Sunday, 5 April 2026
Akan	Fokwasi
Armenian	19 Ahekani 1475
Aztec	Tlaxochimaco 5, 8 Ācatl
Babylonian	16 Adaru, 2336 SE
Balinese pawukon	Menga, Pasah, Sri, Paing, Tungleh, Redite of Sinta, Sri, Dangu, Sri
Bengali	22 Chaitro, BS 1432
Chinese	Yin Earth Rooster・Room Mansion; Fire Horse Year, Month 2, Day 18 (Qingming, 15 days until Guyu)
Common Era	5 April 2026 CE
Coptic	27 Paremhat, AM 1742
Egyptian	24 Mesori, 2774 NE
Ethiopian	27 Magābit, 2018 Amätä Məhrät
French Republican	Décade II, Sextidi de Germinal de l'Année 234 de la République
Gregorian	5 April, AD 2026
Hebrew	18 Nisan, AM 5786; Omer 3
Hindu	Viśākhā・Vajra; Solar: 23 Caitra, 1947 SE; Lunisolar: Tr̥tīyā, Kṛishna pakṣa of Caitra, 2083 VE; Rāudra・5126 KY・1,872,670
Icelandic	Sunnudagur, 13 Einmánuður 2025
Islamic	17 Shawwal, AH 1447 (using tabular method)
ISO week date	2026-W14-7
Japanese	18 Kisaragi, Reiwa 8 (Seimei, 15 days until Kokuu)
Julian	23 March, AD 2026 (AM 7534)
Julian day	2461136
Korean	18 Tokkidal, 4359 DE
Maya	13.0.13.8.13; 6 Pop, 8 Ben
Roman	ante diem X Kalendas Apriles, MMDCCLXXIX AUC
Solar Hijri	16 Farvardin, SH 1405
Tibetan	18 dbo, me pho rta 2153 or 1772 or 1000

<<	April					>>
Su	Mo	Tu	We	Th	Fr	Sa
			1	2	3	4
5	6	7	8	9	10	11
12	13	14	15	16	17	18
19	20	21	22	23	24	25
26	27	28	29	30
2026

April 5 in recent years
2026 (Sunday)
2025 (Saturday)
2024 (Friday)
2023 (Wednesday)
2022 (Tuesday)
2021 (Monday)
2020 (Sunday)
2019 (Friday)
2018 (Thursday)
2017 (Wednesday)

April 5 is the 95th day of the year (96th in leap years) in the Gregorian calendar; 270 days remain until the end of the year.

== Events ==
=== Pre-1600 ===
- 823 – Lothair I is crowned King of Italy by Pope Paschal I.
- 919 – The second Fatimid invasion of Egypt begins, when the Fatimid heir-apparent, al-Qa'im bi-Amr Allah, sets out from Raqqada at the head of his army.
- 1242 – During the Battle on the Ice of Lake Peipus, Russian forces, led by Alexander Nevsky, rebuff an invasion attempt by the Teutonic Knights.
- 1536 – Charles V makes a Royal Entry into Rome, demolishing a swath of the city to re-enact a Roman triumph.
- 1566 – Two hundred Dutch noblemen, led by Hendrick van Brederode, force themselves into the presence of Margaret of Parma and present the Petition of Compromise, denouncing the Spanish Inquisition in the Seventeen Provinces.

=== 1601–1900 ===
- 1614 – In Virginia, Native American Pocahontas marries English colonist John Rolfe.
- 1614 – The second English Parliament of king James I, the so-called Addled Parliament, opens.
- 1621 – The Mayflower sets sail from Plymouth, Massachusetts on a return trip to England.
- 1792 – United States President George Washington exercises his authority to veto a bill, the first time this power is used in the United States.
- 1795 – Peace of Basel between France and Prussia is made.
- 1818 – In the Battle of Maipú, Chile's independence movement, led by Bernardo O'Higgins and José de San Martín, win a decisive victory over Spain, leaving 2,000 Spaniards and 1,000 Chilean patriots dead.
- 1862 – American Civil War: The Battle of Yorktown begins.
- 1879 – Bolivia declares war on Chile, and Chile declares war on Peru, starting the War of the Pacific.

=== 1901–present ===
- 1902 – A stand box collapses at Ibrox Park (now Ibrox Stadium) in Glasgow, Scotland, which led to the deaths of 25 and injuries to more than 500 supporters during an international association football match between Scotland and England.
- 1910 – The Transandine Railway connecting Chile and Argentina is inaugurated.
- 1922 – The American Birth Control League, forerunner of Planned Parenthood, is incorporated.
- 1932 – Dominion of Newfoundland: Ten thousand rioters seize the Colonial Building leading to the end of self-government.
- 1933 – U.S. President Franklin D. Roosevelt signs two executive orders: 6101 to establish the Civilian Conservation Corps, and 6102 "forbidding the Hoarding of Gold Coin, Gold Bullion, and Gold Certificates" by U.S. citizens.
- 1933 – Andorran Revolution: The Young Andorrans occupy the Casa de la Vall and force the government to hold democratic elections with universal male suffrage.
- 1936 – Tupelo–Gainesville tornado outbreak: An F5 tornado kills 233 in Tupelo, Mississippi.
- 1938 – Spanish Civil War: Two days after the Nationalist army occupied the Catalan city of Lleida, dictator Francisco Franco decrees the abolition of the Generalitat (the autonomous government of Catalonia), the self-government granted by the Republic, and the official status of the Catalan language.
- 1942 – World War II: Adolf Hitler issues Fuhrer Directive No. 41 summarizing Case Blue, including the German Sixth Army's planned assault on Stalingrad.
- 1942 – World War II: The Imperial Japanese Navy launches a carrier-based air attack on Colombo, Ceylon during the Indian Ocean raid. Port and civilian facilities are damaged and the Royal Navy cruisers HMS Cornwall and HMS Dorsetshire are sunk southwest of the island.
- 1943 – World War II: United States Army Air Forces bomber aircraft accidentally cause more than 900 civilian deaths, including 209 children, and 1,300 wounded among the civilian population of the Belgian town of Mortsel. Their target was the Erla factory 1 kilometre (0.62 mi) from the residential area hit.
- 1945 – Cold War: Yugoslav leader Josip Broz Tito signs an agreement with the Soviet Union to allow "temporary entry of Soviet troops into Yugoslav territory".
- 1946 – Soviet troops end their year-long occupation of the Danish island of Bornholm.
- 1946 – A Fleet Air Arm Vickers Wellington crashes into a residential area in Rabat, Malta during a training exercise, killing all four crew members and 16 civilians on the ground.
- 1949 – A fire in a hospital in Effingham, Illinois, kills 77 people and leads to nationwide fire code improvements in the United States.
- 1951 – Cold War: Ethel and Julius Rosenberg are sentenced to death for spying for the Soviet Union.
- 1956 – Cuban Revolution: Fidel Castro declares himself at war with Cuban President Fulgencio Batista.
- 1958 – Ripple Rock, an underwater threat to navigation in the Seymour Narrows in Canada, is destroyed in one of the largest non-nuclear controlled explosions of the time.
- 1965 – My Fair Lady wins Best Picture at the 37th Academy Awards.
- 1966 – During the Buddhist Uprising, South Vietnamese Prime Minister Nguyễn Cao Kỳ personally attempts to lead the capture of the restive city of Đà Nẵng before backing down.
- 1971 – In Sri Lanka, Janatha Vimukthi Peramuna launches a revolt against the United Front government of Sirimavo Bandaranaike.
- 1974 – Carrie, the first novel by American author Stephen King, is published for the first time with a print run of 30,000 copies.
- 1976 – In China, the April Fifth Movement leads to the Tiananmen Incident.
- 1977 – The US Supreme Court rules that congressional legislation that diminished the size of the Sioux people's reservation thereby destroyed the tribe's jurisdictional authority over the area in Rosebud Sioux Tribe v. Kneip.
- 1983 – The People's Armed Police is officially founded.
- 1991 – An ASA EMB 120 crashes in Brunswick, Georgia, killing all 23 aboard, including Sen. John Tower and astronaut Sonny Carter.
- 1991 – The Space Shuttle Atlantis launches on STS-37 to deploy the Compton Gamma Ray Observatory.
- 1992 – Alberto Fujimori, president of Peru, dissolves the Peruvian congress by military force.
- 1992 – Peace protesters Suada Dilberovic and Olga Sučić are killed on the Vrbanja Bridge in Sarajevo, becoming the first casualties of the Bosnian War.
- 1998 – In Japan, the Akashi Kaikyō Bridge opens to traffic, becoming the longest bridge span in the world.
- 1999 – Two Libyans suspected of bringing down Pan Am Flight 103 in 1988 are handed over for eventual trial in the Netherlands.
- 2007 – The cruise ship Sea Diamond strikes a volcanic reef near Nea Kameni and sinks the next day. Two passengers were never recovered and are presumed dead.
- 2009 – North Korea launches its controversial Kwangmyŏngsŏng-2 satellite. The satellite passed over mainland Japan, which prompted an immediate reaction from the United Nations Security Council, as well as participating states of six-party talks.
- 2010 – Up to 50 people are killed and another 100 injured in two militant suicide bombings and attacks in Khyber Pakhtunkhwa province of Pakistan: the first on an Awami National Party rally in Timergara; the second on the U.S. Consulate in Peshawar.
- 2010 – Twenty-nine coal miners are killed in an explosion at the Upper Big Branch Mine in West Virginia.
- 2010 – Space Shuttle Discovery is launched on STS-131 to resupply the International Space Station.
- 2018 – Agents with the U.S. Immigration and Customs Enforcement raid a slaughterhouse in Tennessee, detaining nearly 100 undocumented Hispanic workers in one of the largest workplace raids in the history of the United States.

== Births ==
=== Pre-1600 ===
- 1170 – Isabella of Hainault (died 1190)
- 1219 – Wonjong of Goryeo, 24th ruler of Goryeo (died 1274)
- 1279 – Al-Nuwayri, Egyptian Muslim historian (died 1333)
- 1288 – Emperor Go-Fushimi of Japan (died 1336)
- 1315 – James III of Majorca (died 1349)
- 1365 – William II, Duke of Bavaria (died 1417)
- 1472 – Bianca Maria Sforza, Italian wife of Maximilian I, Holy Roman Emperor (died 1510)
- 1521 – Francesco Laparelli, Italian architect (died 1570)
- 1523 – Blaise de Vigenère, French cryptographer and diplomat (died 1596)
- 1533 – Giulio della Rovere, Italian Catholic Cardinal (died 1578)
- 1539 – George Frederick, Margrave of Brandenburg-Ansbach (died 1603)
- 1549 – Princess Elizabeth of Sweden (died 1597)
- 1568 – Pope Urban VIII (died 1644)
- 1588 – Thomas Hobbes, English philosopher (died 1679)
- 1591 – Frederick Ulrich, Duke of Brunswick-Luneburg (died 1634)
- 1595 – John Wilson, English composer and educator (died 1674)

=== 1601–1900 ===
- 1604 – Charles IV, Duke of Lorraine (died 1675)
- 1616 – Frederick, Count Palatine of Zweibrücken (died 1661)
- 1622 – Vincenzo Viviani, Italian mathematician, astronomer, and physicist (died 1703)
- 1649 – Elihu Yale, American-English merchant and philanthropist (died 1721)
- 1656 – Nikita Demidov, Russian industrialist (died 1725)
- 1664 – Élisabeth Thérèse de Lorraine, French noblewoman and Princess of Epinoy (died 1748)
- 1674 – Margravine Elisabeth Sophie of Brandenburg (died 1748)
- 1691 – Louis VIII, Landgrave of Hesse-Darmstadt (died 1768)
- 1692 – Adrienne Lecouvreur, French actress (died 1730)
- 1719 – Axel von Fersen the Elder, Swedish field marshal and politician, Lord Marshal of Sweden (died 1794)
- 1726 – Benjamin Harrison V, American politician, planter and merchant (died 1791)
- 1727 – Pasquale Anfossi, Italian violinist and composer (died 1797)
- 1729 – Frederick Charles Ferdinand, Duke of Brunswick-Lüneburg (died 1809)
- 1730 – Jean Baptiste Seroux d'Agincourt, French archaeologist and historian (died 1814)
- 1732 – Jean-Honoré Fragonard, French painter and etcher (died 1806)
- 1735 – Franziskus Herzan von Harras, Czech Roman Catholic cardinal (died 1804)
- 1739 – Philemon Dickinson, American lawyer and politician (died 1809)
- 1752 – Sébastien Érard, French instrument maker (died 1831)
- 1761 – Sybil Ludington, American figure of the American Revolutionary War (died 1839)
- 1769 – Sir Thomas Hardy, 1st Baronet, English admiral (died 1839)
- 1773 – José María Coppinger, governor of Spanish East Florida (died 1844)
- 1773 – Duchess Therese of Mecklenburg-Strelitz (died 1839)
- 1774 – David Gillespie, American politician and surveyor (died 1829)
- 1777 – Marie Jules César Savigny, French zoologist (died 1851)
- 1782 – Wincenty Krasiński, Polish nobleman (died 1858)
- 1784 – Louis Spohr, German violinist, composer, and conductor (died 1859)
- 1788 – Franz Pforr, German painter (died 1812)
- 1793 – Casimir Delavigne, French poet and dramatist (died 1843)
- 1793 – Felix de Muelenaere, Belgian politician (died 1862)
- 1795 – Henry Havelock, British general (died 1857)
- 1799 – Jacques Denys Choisy, Swiss clergyman and botanist (died 1859)
- 1801 – Félix Dujardin, French biologist (died 1860)
- 1801 – Vincenzo Gioberti, Italian philosopher, publicist and politician (died 1852)
- 1804 – Matthias Jakob Schleiden, German botanist (died 1881)
- 1809 – Karl Felix Halm, German scholar and critic (died 1882)
- 1810 – Sir Henry Rawlinson, British East India Company army officer and politician (died 1895)
- 1811 – Jules Dupré, French painter (died 1889)
- 1814 – Felix Lichnowsky, Czech soldier and politician (died 1848)
- 1820 – Gaspard-Félix Tournachon, French photographer, caricaturist, journalist, novelist and balloonist
- 1822 – Émile Louis Victor de Laveleye, Belgian economist (died 1892)
- 1827 – Joseph Lister, English surgeon and academic (died 1912)
- 1832 – Jules Ferry, French lawyer and politician, 44th Prime Minister of France (died 1893)
- 1834 – Prentice Mulford, American humorist and author (died 1891)
- 1834 – Wilhelm Olbers Focke, German medical doctor and botanist (died 1922)
- 1834 – Frank R. Stockton, American writer and humorist (died 1902)
- 1835 – Vítězslav Hálek, Czech poet, writer, journalist, dramatist and theatre critic. (died 1874)
- 1837 – Algernon Charles Swinburne, English poet, playwright, novelist, and critic (died 1909)
- 1839 – Robert Smalls, African-American ship's pilot, sea captain, and politician (died 1915)
- 1840 – Ghazaros Aghayan, Armenian historian and linguist (died 1911)
- 1842 – Hans Hildebrand, Swedish archaeologist (died 1913)
- 1845 – Friedrich Sigmund Merkel, German anatomist and histopathologist (died 1919)
- 1845 – Jules Cambon, French diplomat (died 1935)
- 1846 – Sigmund Exner, Austrian physiologist (died 1926)
- 1846 – Henry Wellesley, British peer and politician (died 1900)
- 1848 – Thure de Thulstrup, American illustrator (died 1930)
- 1848 – Ulrich Wille, Swiss army general (died 1925)
- 1850 – Enrico Mazzanti, Italian engineer and cartoonist (died 1910)
- 1852 – Émile Billard, French sailor (died 1930)
- 1852 – Walter W. Winans, American marksman and sculptor (died 1920)
- 1852 – Franz Eckert, German composer and musician (died 1916)
- 1856 – Booker T. Washington, African-American educator, essayist and historian (died 1915)
- 1857 – Alexander of Battenberg (died 1893)
- 1858 – Washington Atlee Burpee, Canadian businessman, founded Burpee Seeds (died 1915)
- 1859 – Reinhold Seeberg, German theologian (died 1935)
- 1860 – Harry S. Barlow, British tennis player (died 1917)
- 1862 – Louis Ganne, French conductor (died 1923)
- 1862 – Leo Stern, English cellist (died 1904)
- 1863 – Princess Victoria of Hesse and by Rhine (died 1950)
- 1867 – Ernest Lewis, British tennis player (died 1930)
- 1869 – Sergey Chaplygin, Russian physicist, mathematician, and engineer (died 1942)
- 1869 – Albert Roussel, French composer (died 1937)
- 1870 – Motobu Chōki, Japanese karateka (died 1944)
- 1871 – Stanisław Grabski, Polish economist and politician (died 1949)
- 1872 – Samuel Cate Prescott, American microbiologist and chemist (died 1962)
- 1873 – Joseph Rheden, Austrian astronomer (died 1946)
- 1874 – Emmanuel Célestin Suhard, French Cardinal of the Catholic Church (died 1949)
- 1874 – Manuel María Ponce Brousset, President of Peru (died 1966)
- 1878 – Albert Champion, French cyclist (died 1927)
- 1878 – Georg Misch, German philosopher (died 1965)
- 1878 – Paul Weinstein, German high jumper (died 1964)
- 1879 – Arthur Berriedale Keith, Scottish lawyer (died 1944)
- 1879 – Nikolaus zu Dohna-Schlodien, German naval officer and author (died 1956)
- 1880 – Eric Carlberg, Swedish Army officer, diplomat, shooter, fencer and modern pentathlete (died 1963)
- 1880 – Vilhelm Carlberg, Swedish Army officer and shooter (died 1970)
- 1882 – Song Jiaoren, Chinese revolutionary (died 1913)
- 1882 – Natalia Sedova, 2nd wife of Leon Trotsky (died 1962)
- 1883 – Walter Huston, Canadian-American actor and singer (died 1950)
- 1884 – Ion Inculeț, Bessarabian academic and politician, President of Moldova (died 1940)
- 1885 – Dimitrie Cuclin, Romanian composer (died 1978)
- 1886 – Gotthelf Bergsträsser, German linguist (died 1933)
- 1886 – Frederick Lindemann, British physicist (died 1957)
- 1886 – Gustavo Jiménez, Peruvian colonel and politician, 73rd President of Peru (died 1933)
- 1887 – William Cowhig, British gymnast (died 1964)
- 1889 – Vicente Ferreira Pastinha, Brazilian martial artist (died 1981)
- 1890 – Karl Kirk, Danish gymnast (died 1955)
- 1890 – William Moore, British track and field athlete (died 1956)
- 1891 – Arnold Jackson, English runner, soldier, and lawyer (died 1972)
- 1891 – Laura Vicuña, Chilean nun (died 1904)
- 1892 – Raymond Bonney, American ice hockey player (died 1964)
- 1893 – Frithjof Andersen, Norwegian wrestler (died 1975)
- 1893 – Clas Thunberg, Finnish speed skater (died 1973)
- 1894 – Lawrence Dale Bell, American industrialist and founder of Bell Aircraft Corporation (died 1956)
- 1894 – Hans Hüttig, German SS officer (died 1980)
- 1894 – Carl Rudolf Florin, Swedish botanist (died 1965)
- 1895 – Mike O'Dowd, American boxer (died 1957)
- 1896 – Einar Lundborg, Swedish aviator (died 1931)
- 1897 – Hans Schuberth, German politician (died 1976)
- 1898 – Solange d'Ayen, French noblewoman, Duchess of Ayen and journalist (died 1976)
- 1899 – Alfred Blalock, American surgeon and academic (died 1964)
- 1900 – Herbert Bayer, Austrian-American graphic designer, painter, and photographer (died 1985)
- 1900 – Roman Steinberg, Estonian wrestler (died 1939)
- 1900 – Spencer Tracy, American actor (died 1967)

=== 1901–present ===
- 1901 – Curt Bois, German actor (died 1991)
- 1901 – Chester Bowles, American diplomat and ambassador (died 1986)
- 1901 – Melvyn Douglas, American actor (died 1981)
- 1901 – Doggie Julian, American football, basketball, and baseball player and coach (died 1967)
- 1902 – Menachem Mendel Schneerson, Russian-American rabbi (died 1994)
- 1903 – Marion Aye, American actress (died 1951)
- 1904 – Richard Eberhart, American poet and academic (died 2005)
- 1906 – Albert Charles Smith, American botanist (died 1999)
- 1906 – Fernando Germani, Italian organist (died 1998)
- 1906 – Ted Morgan, New Zealand boxer (died 1952)
- 1907 – Sanya Dharmasakti, Thai jurist (died 2002)
- 1908 – Bette Davis, American actress (died 1989)
- 1908 – Kurt Neumann, German director (died 1958)
- 1908 – Jagjivan Ram, Indian politician, 4th Deputy Prime Minister of India (died 1986)
- 1908 – Herbert von Karajan, Austrian conductor and manager (died 1989)
- 1909 – Albert R. Broccoli, American film producer, co-founded Eon Productions (died 1996)
- 1909 – Giacomo Gentilomo, Italian film director and painter (died 2001)
- 1909 – Károly Sós, Hungarian footballer and manager (died 1991)
- 1909 – Erwin Wegner, German hurdler (died 1945)
- 1910 – Sven Andersson, Swedish politician (died 1987)
- 1910 – Oronzo Pugliese, Italian football manager (died 1990)
- 1911 – Hedi Amara Nouira, Tunisian politician (died 1993)
- 1911 – Johnny Revolta, American golfer (died 1991)
- 1912 – Jehan Buhan, French fencer (died 1999)
- 1912 – Habib Elghanian, Iranian businessman (died 1979)
- 1912 – Antonio Ferri, Italian scientist (died 1975)
- 1912 – Carlos Guastavino, Argentine composer (died 2000)
- 1912 – Makar Honcharenko, Ukrainian footballer and manager (died 1997)
- 1912 – John Le Mesurier, English actor (died 1983)
- 1912 – István Örkény, Hungarian author and playwright (died 1979)
- 1912 – Bill Roberts, English sprinter and soldier (died 2001)
- 1913 – Antoni Clavé, Catalan artist (died 2005)
- 1913 – Nicolas Grunitzky, 2nd President of Togo (died 1969)
- 1913 – Ruth Smith, Faroese artist (died 1958)
- 1914 – Felice Borel, Italian footballer (died 1993)
- 1916 – Gregory Peck, American actor, political activist, and producer (died 2003)
- 1917 – Robert Bloch, American author (died 1994)
- 1917 – Frans Gommers, Belgian footballer (died 1996)
- 1919 – Lester James Peries, Sri Lankan director, screenwriter, and producer (died 2018)
- 1920 – Barend Biesheuvel, Dutch politician, Prime Minister of the Netherlands (died 2001)
- 1920 – Arthur Hailey, English-Canadian soldier and author (died 2004)
- 1920 – Alfonso Thiele, Turkish-Italian race car driver (died 1986)
- 1920 – John Willem Gran, Swedish bishop (died 2008)
- 1921 – Christopher Hewett, English actor and theatre director (died 2001)
- 1922 – Tom Finney, English footballer (died 2014)
- 1922 – Harry Freedman, Polish-Canadian horn player, composer, and educator (died 2005)
- 1922 – Andy Linden, American race car driver (died 1987)
- 1922 – Gale Storm, American actress and singer (died 2009)
- 1923 – Ernest Mandel, German-born Belgian Marxist economist, Trotskyist activist and theorist (died 1995)
- 1923 – Michael V. Gazzo, American actor (died 1995)
- 1923 – Nguyễn Văn Thiệu, Vietnamese general and politician, 5th President of South Vietnam (died 2001)
- 1924 – Igor Borisov, Soviet rower (died 2003)
- 1925 – Janet Rowley, American human geneticist (died 2013)
- 1925 – Pierre Nihant, Belgian cyclist (died 1993)
- 1926 – Roger Corman, American actor, director, producer, and screenwriter (died 2024)
- 1926 – Liang Yusheng, Chinese writer (died 2009)
- 1927 – Thanin Kraivichien, Thai lawyer and politician, 14th prime minister of Thailand (died 2025)
- 1927 – Arne Hoel, Norwegian ski jumper (died 2006)
- 1928 – Enzo Cannavale, Italian actor (died 2011)
- 1928 – Tony Williams, American singer (died 1992)
- 1929 – Hugo Claus, Belgian author, poet, and painter (died 2008)
- 1929 – Ivar Giaever, Norwegian-American physicist and academic, Nobel Prize laureate (died 2025)
- 1929 – Nigel Hawthorne, English actor and producer (died 2001)
- 1929 – Joe Meek, English songwriter and producer (died 1967)
- 1929 – Mahmoud Mollaghasemi, Iranian wrestler
- 1930 – Mary Costa, American singer and actress
- 1930 – Pierre Lhomme, French director of photography (died 2019)
- 1931 – Jack Clement, American singer-songwriter and producer (died 2013)
- 1931 – Héctor Olivera, Argentine director, producer and screenwriter
- 1933 – Feridun Buğeker, Turkish footballer (died 2014)
- 1933 – Frank Gorshin, American actor (died 2005)
- 1933 – Barbara Holland, American author (died 2010)
- 1933 – K. Kailasapathy, Sri Lankan journalist and academic (died 1982)
- 1934 – John Carey, English author and critic
- 1934 – Roman Herzog, German lawyer and politician, 7th President of Germany (died 2017)
- 1934 – Moise Safra, Brazilian businessman and philanthropist, co-founded Banco Safra (died 2014)
- 1934 – Stanley Turrentine, American saxophonist and composer (died 2000)
- 1935 – Giovanni Cianfriglia, Italian actor (died 2024)
- 1935 – Peter Grant, English talent manager (died 1995)
- 1935 – Donald Lynden-Bell, English astrophysicist and astronomer (died 2018)
- 1935 – Frank Schepke, German rower (died 2017)
- 1936 – Ronnie Bucknum, American race car driver (died 1992)
- 1936 – Glenn Jordan, American director and producer
- 1936 – Dragoljub Minić, Yugoslavian chess Grandmaster (died 2005)
- 1937 – Joseph Lelyveld, American journalist and author (died 2024)
- 1937 – Colin Powell, American general and politician, 65th United States Secretary of State (died 2021)
- 1937 – Andrzej Schinzel, Polish mathematician (died 2021)
- 1937 – Arie Selinger, Israeli volleyball player and manager
- 1937 – Juan Vicente Lezcano, Paraguayan footballer (died 2012)
- 1938 – Colin Bland, Zimbabwean-South African cricketer (died 2018)
- 1938 – Mal Colston, Australian educator and politician (died 2003)
- 1938 – Nancy Holt, American sculptor and painter (died 2014)
- 1938 – Natalya Kustinskaya, Soviet actress (died 2012)
- 1938 – Giorgos Sideris, Greek footballer
- 1939 – Leka I, Crown Prince of Albania (died 2011)
- 1939 – Crispian St. Peters, English singer-songwriter (died 2010)
- 1939 – Haidar Abu Bakr al-Attas, Prime Minister of Yemen
- 1939 – Ronald White, American singer-songwriter (died 1995)
- 1939 – David Winters, English-American actor, choreographer and producer (died 2019)
- 1940 – Tommy Cash, American singer-songwriter and guitarist (died 2024)
- 1940 – Gilles Proulx, Canadian journalist, historian, and radio host
- 1941 – Michael Moriarty, American-Canadian actor
- 1941 – Dave Swarbrick, English singer-songwriter and fiddler (died 2016)
- 1942 – Allan Clarke, English singer-songwriter
- 1942 – Pascal Couchepin, Swiss politician
- 1942 – Juan Gisbert Sr., Spanish tennis player
- 1942 – Peter Greenaway, Welsh director and screenwriter
- 1943 – Dean Brown, Australian politician, 41st Premier of South Australia
- 1943 – Max Gail, American actor and director
- 1943 – Fighting Harada, Japanese boxer
- 1943 – Miet Smet, Belgian politician
- 1943 – Jean-Louis Tauran, French cardinal (died 2018)
- 1944 – Willeke van Ammelrooy, Dutch actress and director
- 1944 – János Martonyi, Hungarian politician
- 1944 – Evan Parker, British musician
- 1944 – Douangchay Phichit, Laotian politician (died 2014)
- 1944 – Willy Planckaert, Belgian cyclist
- 1944 – Pedro Rosselló, Puerto Rican physician and politician, 7th Governor of Puerto Rico
- 1944 – Peter T. King, American soldier, lawyer, and politician
- 1945 – Ove Bengtson, Swedish tennis player
- 1945 – Steve Carver, American director and producer (died 2021)
- 1945 – Cem Karaca, Turkish musician (died 2004)
- 1945 – Tommy Smith, English footballer (died 2019)
- 1946 – Jane Asher, English actress
- 1946 – Julio Ángel Fernández, Uruguayan astronomer
- 1946 – Björn Granath, Swedish actor (died 2017)
- 1946 – Georgi Markov, Bulgarian Greco-Roman wrestler
- 1947 – Đurđica Bjedov, Yugoslav swimmer
- 1947 – Willy Chirino, Cuban-American musician
- 1947 – Gloria Macapagal Arroyo, Filipino academic and politician, 14th President of the Philippines
- 1947 – Ramón Mifflin, Peruvian footballer
- 1947 – Virendra Sharma, Indian-English lawyer and politician
- 1948 – Pierre-Albert Chapuisat, Swiss footballer
- 1948 – Dave Holland, English drummer (died 2018)
- 1948 – Roy McFarland, English footballer and manager
- 1949 – Stanley Dziedzic, American wrestler
- 1949 – Larry Franco, American film producer
- 1949 – Judith Resnik, American engineer and astronaut (died 1986)
- 1950 – Ann C. Crispin, American writer (died 2013)
- 1950 – Franklin Chang Díaz, Costa Rican-Chinese American astronaut and physicist
- 1950 – Agnetha Fältskog, Swedish singer-songwriter and producer
- 1950 – Toshiko Fujita, Japanese actress, singer and narrator (died 2018)
- 1950 – Miki Manojlović, Serbian actor
- 1951 – Les Binks, Irish drummer and songwriter
- 1951 – Yevgeniy Gavrilenko, Belarusian hurdler
- 1951 – Nedim Gürsel, Turkish writer
- 1951 – Dean Kamen, American inventor and businessman, founded Segway Inc.
- 1951 – Dave McArtney, New Zealand singer-songwriter and guitarist (died 2013)
- 1951 – Ubol Ratana, Thai Princess
- 1952 – Alfie Conn, Scottish international footballer
- 1952 – John C. Dvorak, American author and editor
- 1952 – Sandy Mayer, American tennis player
- 1952 – Dennis Mortimer, English footballer
- 1952 – Mitch Pileggi, American actor
- 1953 – Frank Gaffney, American journalist and radio host
- 1953 – Keiko Han, Japanese actress
- 1953 – Tae Jin-ah, South Korean singer
- 1953 – Raleb Majadele, Israeli politician
- 1953 – Ian Swales, English accountant and politician
- 1954 – Guy Bertrand, Canadian linguist and radio host
- 1954 – Peter Case, American singer-songwriter and guitarist
- 1954 – Mohamed Ben Mouza, Tunisian footballer
- 1954 – Stan Ridgway, American singer-songwriter and guitarist
- 1954 – Yoshiichi Watanabe, Japanese footballer
- 1955 – Charlotte de Turckheim, French actress, producer, and screenwriter
- 1955 – Ricardo Ferrero, Argentine footballer (died 2015)
- 1955 – Christian Gourcuff, French footballer and manager
- 1955 – Anthony Horowitz, English author and screenwriter
- 1955 – Bernard Longley, English prelate
- 1955 – Akira Toriyama, Japanese illustrator (died 2024)
- 1955 – Takayoshi Yamano, Japanese footballer
- 1956 – Diamond Dallas Page, American wrestler and actor
- 1956 – Leonid Fedun, Russian businessman
- 1956 – Reid Ribble, American politician
- 1956 – T. V. Smith, English singer-songwriter
- 1957 – Sebastian Adayanthrath, Indian bishop
- 1957 – Karin Roßley, German hurdler
- 1958 – Kevin Dann, Australian rugby league player (died 2021)
- 1958 – Henrik Dettmann, Finnish basketball coach
- 1958 – Ryoichi Kawakatsu, Japanese footballer
- 1958 – Johan Kriek, South African-American tennis player
- 1958 – Daniel Schneidermann, French journalist
- 1958 – Lasantha Wickrematunge, Sri Lankan lawyer and journalist (died 2009)
- 1959 – Paul Chung, Hong Kong actor and host (died 1989)
- 1960 – Asteris Koutoulas, Romanian-German record producer, manager, and author
- 1960 – Larry McCray, American singer-songwriter and guitarist
- 1960 – Ian Redford, Scottish footballer and manager (died 2014)
- 1960 – Hiromi Taniguchi, Japanese long-distance runner
- 1960 – Adnan Terzić, Bosnian politician
- 1961 – Andrea Arnold, English filmmaker and actress
- 1961 – Anna Caterina Antonacci, Italian soprano
- 1961 – Abdulhadi al-Khawaja, Bahraini-Danish human rights activist
- 1961 – Lisa Zane, American actress and singer
- 1962 – Lana Clarkson, American actress and model (died 2003)
- 1962 – Sara Danius, Swedish scholar of literature and aesthetics (died 2019)
- 1962 – Richard Gough, Swedish born Scottish international footballer
- 1962 – Arild Monsen, Norwegian cross-country skier
- 1962 – Kirsan Ilyumzhinov, Russian businessman and politician, 1st President of Kalmykia
- 1963 – Arthur Adams, American comic book artist and writer
- 1964 – Neil Eckersley, British judoka
- 1964 – Vakhtang Iagorashvili, Soviet modern pentathlete
- 1964 – Levon Julfalakyan, Soviet Armenian Greco-Roman wrestler
- 1964 – Marius Lăcătuș, Romanian footballer and coach
- 1965 – Aykut Kocaman, Turkish footballer and manager
- 1965 – Lang Tzu-yun, Taiwanese actress
- 1965 – Elizabeth McIntyre, American freestyle skier
- 1965 – Svetlana Paramygina, Belarusian biathlete
- 1966 – Yoon Hyun, South Korean judoka
- 1966 – Mike McCready, American guitarist and songwriter
- 1966 – Peter Overton, English-Australian journalist and television host
- 1967 – Troy Gentry, American singer-songwriter and guitarist (died 2017)
- 1967 – Franck Silvestre, French footballer
- 1967 – Erland Johnsen, Norwegian footballer
- 1967 – Laima Zilporytė, Soviet cyclist
- 1968 – Paula Cole, American singer-songwriter and pianist
- 1969 – Dinos Angelidis, Greek basketball player
- 1969 – Viatcheslav Djavanian, Russian cyclist
- 1969 – Pontus Kåmark, Swedish footballer
- 1969 – Pavlo Khnykin, Ukrainian swimmer
- 1969 – Tomislav Piplica, Bosnian footballer and manager
- 1969 – Ravindra Prabhat, Indian writer and journalist
- 1970 – Soheil Ayari, French race car driver
- 1970 – Valérie Bonneton, French actress
- 1970 – Diamond D, American hip hop producer
- 1970 – Petar Genov, Bulgarian chess grandmaster
- 1970 – Thea Gill, Canadian actress
- 1970 – Miho Hatori, Japanese singer-songwriter
- 1970 – Irina Timofeyeva, Russian long-distance runner
- 1971 – Dong Abay, Filipino singer-songwriter and guitarist
- 1971 – Krista Allen, American actress
- 1971 – Austin Berry, Costa Rican footballer
- 1971 – Simona Cavallari, Italian actress
- 1971 – Victoria Hamilton, English actress
- 1971 – Nelson Parraguez, Chilean footballer
- 1971 – Kim Soo-nyung, South Korean archer
- 1972 – Nima Arkani-Hamed, American-Canadian theoretical physicist
- 1972 – Tom Coronel, Dutch race car driver
- 1972 – Paul Okon, Australian footballer and manager
- 1972 – Duncan Spencer, English cricketer
- 1972 – Yasuhiro Takemoto, Japanese animator and director (died 2019)
- 1972 – Junko Takeuchi, Japanese actress
- 1973 – Élodie Bouchez, French-American actress
- 1973 – Brendan Cannon, Australian rugby player
- 1973 – Lidia Trettel, Italian snowboarder
- 1973 – Pharrell Williams, American singer, songwriter and rapper
- 1974 – Sandra Bagarić, Croatian opera singer and actress
- 1974 – Julien Boutter, French tennis player
- 1974 – Katja Holanti, Finnish biathlete
- 1974 – Oleg Khodkov, Russian handball player
- 1974 – Ariel López, Argentine footballer
- 1974 – Lukas Ridgeston, Slovak actor and director
- 1974 – Vyacheslav Voronin, Russian high jumper
- 1975 – Sarah Baldock, English organist and conductor
- 1975 – John Hartson, Welsh footballer and coach
- 1975 – Juicy J, American rapper and producer
- 1975 – Serhiy Klymentiev, Ukrainian ice hockey player
- 1975 – Caitlin Moran, English journalist, author, and critic
- 1975 – Marcos Vales, Spanish footballer
- 1975 – Shammond Williams, American basketball player and coach
- 1976 – Luis de Agustini, Uruguayan footballer
- 1976 – Péter Biros, Hungarian water polo player
- 1976 – Sterling K. Brown, American actor
- 1976 – Aleksei Budõlin, Estonian judoka
- 1976 – Simone Inzaghi, Italian footballer
- 1976 – Fernando Morientes, Spanish footballer and coach
- 1976 – Natascha Ragosina, Russian boxer
- 1976 – Henrik Stenson, Swedish golfer
- 1976 – Valeria Straneo, Italian long-distance runner
- 1976 – Indrek Tobreluts, Estonian biathlete
- 1976 – Anouska van der Zee, Dutch cyclist
- 1977 – Jonathan Erlich, Israeli tennis player
- 1977 – Trevor Letowski, Canadian ice hockey player and coach
- 1977 – Daniel Majstorović, Swedish footballer
- 1978 – Dwain Chambers, British track sprinter
- 1978 – Marcone Amaral Costa, Qatari footballer
- 1978 – Tarek El-Said, Egyptian footballer
- 1978 – Jairo Patiño, Colombian footballer
- 1978 – Sohyang, South Korean singer
- 1978 – Stephen Jackson, American basketball player
- 1978 – Arnaud Tournant, French cyclist
- 1978 – Franziska van Almsick, German swimmer
- 1978 – Günther Weidlinger, Austrian long-distance runner
- 1979 – Vlada Avramov, Serbian footballer
- 1979 – Josh Boone, American screenwriter and director
- 1979 – Song Dae-nam, South Korean judoka
- 1979 – Timo Hildebrand, German footballer
- 1979 – Imany, French singer
- 1979 – Barel Mouko, Congolese footballer
- 1979 – Cesare Natali, Italian footballer
- 1979 – Mitsuo Ogasawara, Japanese footballer
- 1979 – Alexander Resch, German luger
- 1979 – Andrius Velička, Lithuanian footballer
- 1979 – Dante Wesley, American football player
- 1979 – Chen Yanqing, Chinese weightlifter
- 1980 – Matt Bonner, American basketball player
- 1980 – Alberta Brianti, Italian tennis player
- 1980 – Rafael Cavalcante, Brazilian mixed martial artist
- 1980 – David Chocarro, Argentinian baseball player and actor
- 1980 – Mike Glumac, Canadian ice hockey player
- 1980 – Mario Kasun, Croatian basketball player
- 1980 – Lee Jae-won, South Korean DJ and singer
- 1980 – Joris Mathijsen, Dutch footballer
- 1980 – Rasmus Quist Hansen, Danish rower
- 1980 – Odlanier Solís, Cuban boxer
- 1981 – Matthew Emmons, American rifle shooter
- 1981 – Michael A. Monsoor, American sailor, Medal of Honor recipient (died 2006)
- 1981 – Mariqueen Maandig, Filipino-American musician and singer-songwriter
- 1981 – Daba Modibo Keïta, Malian taekwondo athlete
- 1981 – Marissa Nadler, American musician
- 1981 – Tom Riley, English actor and producer
- 1981 – Mompati Thuma, Botswana footballer
- 1981 – Pieter Weening, Dutch cyclist
- 1982 – Hayley Atwell, English-American actress
- 1982 – Matheus Coradini Vivian, Brazilian footballer
- 1982 – Thomas Hitzlsperger, German footballer
- 1982 – Kelly Pavlik, American boxer
- 1982 – Matt Pickens, American soccer player
- 1982 – Alexandre Prémat, French race car driver
- 1982 – Danylo Sapunov, Ukrainian-Kazakhstani triathlete
- 1982 – Hubert Schwab, Swiss cyclist
- 1982 – Marcel Seip, Dutch former footballer
- 1983 – Jaime Castrillón, Colombian footballer
- 1983 – Jorge Andrés Martínez, Uruguayan footballer
- 1983 – Brock Radunske, Canadian-South Korean ice hockey player
- 1983 – Yohann Sangaré, French basketball player
- 1983 – Cécile Storti, French cross-country skier
- 1983 – Shikha Uberoi, Indian-American tennis player
- 1984 – Marshall Allman, American actor
- 1984 – Aram Mp3, Armenian singer and comedian
- 1984 – Rune Brattsveen, Norwegian biathlete
- 1984 – Alexei Glukhov, Russian ice hockey player
- 1984 – Maartje Goderie, Dutch field hockey player
- 1984 – Darija Jurak, Croatian tennis player
- 1984 – Dejan Kelhar, Slovenian footballer
- 1984 – Dmitry Kozonchuk, Russian cyclist
- 1984 – Shin Min-a, South Korean actress
- 1984 – Jess Sum, Hong Kong actress
- 1984 – Peter Penz, Austrian luger
- 1984 – Samuele Preisig, Swiss footballer
- 1984 – Cristian Săpunaru, Romanian footballer
- 1984 – Fabio Vitaioli, San Marinese footballer
- 1984 – Kisho Yano, Japanese footballer
- 1984 – Saba Qamar, Pakistani actress-model
- 1985 – Daniel Congré, French footballer
- 1985 – Erwin l'Ami, Dutch chess player
- 1985 – Jolanda Keizer, Dutch heptathlete
- 1985 – Sergey Khachatryan, Armenian violinist
- 1985 – Linas Pilibaitis, Lithuanian footballer
- 1985 – Jan Smeets, Dutch chess grandmaster
- 1985 – Kristof Vandewalle, Belgian cyclist
- 1986 – Anna Sophia Berglund, American model and actress
- 1986 – Anzor Boltukayev, Chechen wrestler
- 1986 – Diego Chará, Colombian footballer
- 1986 – Charlotte Flair, American wrestler, author and actress
- 1986 – Róbert Kasza, Hungarian Modern pentathlete
- 1986 – Eetu Muinonen, Finnish footballer
- 1986 – Manuel Ruz, Spanish footballer
- 1986 – Albert Selimov, Azerbaijani boxer
- 1987 – Max Grün, German footballer
- 1987 – Balázs Hárai, Hungarian water polo player
- 1987 – Anton Kokorin, Russian sprint athlete
- 1987 – Fyodor Kudryashov, Russian footballer
- 1987 – Etiënne Reijnen, Dutch footballer
- 1988 – Gerson Acevedo, Chilean footballer
- 1988 – Teresa Almeida, Angolan handball player
- 1988 – Quade Cooper, New Zealand-Australian rugby player and boxer
- 1988 – Jonathan Davies, Welsh rugby union player
- 1988 – Gevorg Ghazaryan, Armenian footballer
- 1988 – Alisha Glass, American ex-indoor volleyball player
- 1988 – Vurğun Hüseynov, Azerbaijani footballer
- 1988 – Matthias Jaissle, German footballer and manager
- 1988 – Christopher Papamichalopoulos, Cypriot skier
- 1988 – Zack Smith, Canadian ice hockey player
- 1988 – Pape Sy, French basketball player
- 1988 – Alexey Volkov, Russian biathlete
- 1989 – Kader Amadou, Nigerien footballer
- 1989 – Yémi Apithy, Beninese fencer
- 1989 – Liemarvin Bonevacia, Dutch sprinter
- 1989 – Freddie Fox, English actor
- 1989 – Emre Güral, Turkish footballer
- 1989 – Justin Holiday, American basketball player
- 1989 – Rachel Homan, Canadian curler
- 1989 – Lily James, English actress
- 1989 – Trevor Marsicano, American speed skater
- 1989 – Jonathan Rossini, Swiss footballer
- 1989 – Kiki Sukezane, Japanese actress
- 1989 – Sohsuke Takatani, Japanese wrestler
- 1990 – Amer Said Al-Shatri, Omani footballer
- 1990 – Alex Cuthbert, Welsh rugby player
- 1990 – Patrick Dangerfield, Australian footballer
- 1990 – Fredy Hinestroza, Colombian footballer
- 1990 – Chen Huijia, Chinese swimmer
- 1990 – Haruma Miura, Japanese actor and singer (died 2020)
- 1990 – Ismaeel Mohammad, Qatari footballer
- 1990 – Iryna Pamialova, Belarusian canoeist
- 1990 – Jakub Sedláček, Czech ice hockey player
- 1990 – Sercan Yıldırım, Turkish footballer
- 1990 – Género Zeefuik, Dutch footballer
- 1991 – Yassine Bounou, Moroccan footballer
- 1991 – Nathaniel Clyne, English footballer
- 1991 – Adriano Grimaldi, Italian-German footballer
- 1991 – Joël Mall, Swiss footballer
- 1991 – Guilherme dos Santos Torres, Brazilian footballer
- 1992 – Emmalyn Estrada, Canadian singer-songwriter and dancer
- 1992 – Shintaro Kurumaya, Japanese footballer
- 1992 – Kaveh Rezaei, Iranian footballer
- 1992 – Dmytro Ryzhuk, Ukrainian footballer
- 1993 – Andreas Bouchalakis, Greek footballer
- 1993 – Maya DiRado, American swimmer
- 1993 – Laura Feiersinger, Austrian footballer
- 1993 – Benjamin Garcia, French rugby league player
- 1993 – Scottie Wilbekin, American-Turkish basketball player
- 1994 – Mateusz Bieniek, Polish volleyball player
- 1994 – Edem Rjaïbi, Tunisian footballer
- 1994 – Richard Sánchez, Mexican footballer
- 1995 – Daniel Caesar, Canadian singer-songwriter
- 1995 – Viliame Kikau, Fijian rugby league player
- 1995 – Sei Muroya, Japanese footballer
- 1995 – Gleb Rassadkin, Belarusian footballer
- 1995 – Sebastian Starke Hedlund, Swedish footballer
- 1996 – Nicolas Beer, Danish race car driver
- 1996 – Raouf Benguit, Algerian footballer
- 1997 – Borja Mayoral, Spanish footballer
- 1997 – Dominik Mysterio, American wrestler
- 1998 – Nathan Broadhead, Welsh football player
- 1999 – Bobby Miller, American baseball player
- 2001 – Johnny Beecher, American ice hockey player
- 2001 – Felipe Peña, Argentine footballer
- 2003 – Tetairoa McMillan, American football player

== Deaths ==
=== Pre-1600 ===
- 517 – Timothy I of Constantinople, Byzantine patriarch
- 582 – Eutychius of Constantinople, Byzantine patriarch
- 584 – Ruadán of Lorrha, Irish abbot
- 902 – Al-Mu'tadid, Abbasid caliph
- 1168 – Robert de Beaumont, 2nd Earl of Leicester, English politician (born 1104)
- 1183 – Ramon Berenguer III, Spanish count of Cerdanya and Provence
- 1205 – Isabella I of Jerusalem, queen regnant of Jerusalem (born 1172)
- 1258 – Juliana of Liège, Belgian canoness and saint
- 1308 – Ivan Kőszegi, Hungarian baron and oligarch
- 1325 – Ralph de Monthermer, 1st Baron of Monthermer and Earl of Gloucester (born c. 1270)
- 1419 – Vincent Ferrer, Spanish missionary and saint (born 1350)
- 1431 – Bernard I, margrave of Baden-Baden (born 1364)
- 1512 – Lazzaro Bastiani, Italian painter (born 1429)
- 1534 – Jan Matthys, Dutch anabaptist reformer
- 1594 – Catherine of Palma, Spanish nun (born 1533)

=== 1601–1900 ===
- 1605 – John Stow, English historian and antiquary (born 1524/25)
- 1612 – Diana Scultori, Italian engraver (born 1547)
- 1617 – Alonso Lobo, Spanish composer (born 1555)
- 1626 – Anna Koltovskaya, Russian tsarina
- 1673 – François Caron, Belgian-French explorer and politician, 8th Governor of Formosa (born 1600)
- 1679 – Anne Geneviève de Bourbon, French princess (born 1619)
- 1684 – William Brouncker, English mathematician (born 1620)
- 1684 – Karl Eusebius, prince of Liechtenstein (born 1611)
- 1693 – Anne Marie Louise d'Orléans, French noblewoman (born 1627)
- 1693 – Philip William August, German nobleman (born 1668)
- 1695 – George Savile, English politician, Lord President of the Council (born 1633)
- 1697 – Charles XI, king of Sweden (born 1655)
- 1704 – Christian Ulrich I, German nobleman and Duke of Württemberg-Oels (born 1652)
- 1708 – Christian Heinrich, German prince and member of the House of Hohenzollern (born 1661)
- 1709 – Roger de Piles, French painter, engraver, art critic and diplomat (born 1635)
- 1712 – Jan Luyken, Dutch poet, illustrator and engraver (born 1649)
- 1717 – Jean Jouvenet, French painter (born 1647)
- 1723 – Johann Bernhard Fischer von Erlach, Austrian architect, sculptor and historian (born 1656)
- 1735 – William Derham, English minister and philosopher (born 1657)
- 1751 – Frederick I, prince consort and king of Sweden (born 1676)
- 1765 – Edward Young, English poet and author (born 1683)
- 1767 – Princess Charlotte Wilhelmine of Saxe-Coburg-Saalfeld, German princess of Saxe-Coburg-Saalfeld (born 1685)
- 1768 – Egidio Forcellini, Italian philologist (born 1688)
- 1769 – Marc-Antoine Laugier, Jesuit priest (born 1713)
- 1794 – Georges Danton, French lawyer and politician, French Minister of Justice (born 1759)
- 1794 – François Chabot, French politician (born 1756)
- 1794 – Camille Desmoulins, French journalist, lawyer, and politician (born 1760)
- 1794 – Fabre d'Églantine, French actor, dramatist, poet and politician (born 1750)
- 1794 – Marie-Jean Hérault de Séchelles, French judge and politician (born 1759)
- 1794 – Pierre Philippeaux, French lawyer (born 1754)
- 1794 – François Joseph Westermann, French general (born 1751)
- 1799 – Johann Christoph Gatterer, German historian (born 1727)
- 1804 – Jean-Charles Pichegru, French general (born 1761)
- 1808 – Johann Georg Wille, German engraver (born 1715)
- 1830 – Richard Chenevix, Irish chemist and playwright (born 1774)
- 1831 – Pierre Léonard Vander Linden, Belgian entomologist (born 1797)
- 1842 – Shah Shuja Durrani, 5th Emir of Afghanistan (born 1785)
- 1852 – Prince Felix of Schwarzenberg, (born 1800)
- 1861 – Ferdinand Joachimsthal, German mathematician (born 1818)
- 1862 – Barend Cornelis Koekkoek, Dutch artist (born 1803)
- 1865 – Manfredo Fanti, Italian general (born 1806)
- 1866 – Thomas Hodgkin, British physician (born 1798)
- 1868 – Karel Purkyně, Czech painter (born 1834)
- 1871 – Paolo Savi, Italian geologist and ornithologist (born 1798)
- 1872 – Paul-Auguste-Ernest Laugier, French astronomer (born 1812)
- 1873 – Milivoje Blaznavac, Serbian soldier and politician (born 1824)
- 1882 – Pierre Guillaume Frédéric le Play, (born 1806)
- 1888 – Vsevolod Garshin, Russian author (born 1855)
- 1891 – Johann Hermann Bauer, Austrian chess master (born 1861)
- 1900 – Joseph Bertrand, French mathematician, economist, and academic (born 1822)
- 1900 – Osman Nuri Pasha, Ottoman field marshal and the hero of the Siege of Plevna in 1877 (born 1832)

=== 1901–present ===
- 1901 – Angelo Messedaglia, Italian social scientist and statistician (born 1820)
- 1902 – Hans Ernst August Buchner, German bacteriologist (born 1850)
- 1904 – Ernst Leopold, 4th Prince of Leiningen (born 1830)
- 1904 – Frances Power Cobbe, Irish writer (born 1822)
- 1906 – Eastman Johnson, American painter (born 1824)
- 1914 – Bernard Borggreve, German forestry scientist (born 1836)
- 1916 – Maksim Kovalevsky, Russian sociologist (born 1851)
- 1918 – George Tupou II, King of Tonga (born 1874)
- 1918 – Paul Vidal de La Blache, French geographer (born 1845)
- 1920 – Laurent Marqueste, French sculptor (born 1848)
- 1921 – Alphons Diepenbrock, Dutch composer (born 1862)
- 1921 – Sophie Elkan, Swedish writer and translator (born 1853)
- 1923 – George Herbert, 5th Earl of Carnarvon, English archaeologist and businessman (born 1866)
- 1924 – Victor Hensen, German zoologist (born 1835)
- 1928 – Roy Kilner, English cricketer and soldier (born 1890)
- 1928 – Viktor Oliva, Czech painter and illustrator (born 1861)
- 1929 – Francis Aidan Gasquet, English Benedictine monk (born 1846)
- 1929 – Ludwig von Sybel, German archeologist (born 1846)
- 1932 – María Blanchard, Spanish painter (born 1881)
- 1933 – Earl Derr Biggers, American novelist and playwright (born 1884)
- 1933 – Hjalmar Mellin, Finnish mathematician and functional theorist (born 1854)
- 1934 – Salvatore Di Giacomo, Italian poet, playwright, songwriter and fascist intellectual (born 1860)
- 1934 – Jiro Sato, Japanese tennis player (born 1908)
- 1935 – Achille Locatelli, Roman Catholic cardinal (born 1856)
- 1935 – Emil Młynarski, Polish conductor, violinist, composer, and pedagogue (born 1870)
- 1935 – Franz von Vecsey, Hungarian violinist and composer (born 1893)
- 1936 – Chandler Egan, American golfer and architect (born 1884)
- 1937 – Gustav Adolf Deissmann, (born 1866)
- 1937 – José Benlliure y Gil, Spanish painter (born 1858)
- 1938 – Helena Westermarck, Finnish artist and writer (born 1857)
- 1938 – Verner Lehtimäki, Finnish revolutionary (born 1890)
- 1940 – Charles Freer Andrews, English-Indian priest, missionary, and educator (born 1871)
- 1940 – Robert Maillart, Swiss civil engineer (born 1872)
- 1940 – Jay O'Brien, American bobsledder (born 1883)
- 1940 – Song Zheyuan, Chinese general (born 1885)
- 1941 – Parvin E'tesami, Persian poet (born 1907)
- 1941 – Nigel Gresley, Scottish-English engineer (born 1876)
- 1941 – Franciszek Kleeberg, Polish general (born 1888)
- 1945 – Heinrich Borgmann, German officer (born 1912)
- 1945 – Karl-Otto Koch, German SS officer (born 1897)
- 1946 – Vincent Youmans, American composer and producer (born 1898)
- 1947 – Bernhard Pankok, German painter, artist and architect (born 1872)
- 1947 – Elis Strömgren, Swedish-Danish astronomer (born 1870)
- 1948 – Abby Aldrich Rockefeller, American socialite and philanthropist (born 1874)
- 1949 – Erich Zeigner, Prime Minister of Saxony (born 1886)
- 1950 – Hiroshi Yoshida, Japanese painter (born 1876)
- 1952 – Agnes Morton, British tennis player (born 1872)
- 1954 – Princess Märtha of Sweden, (born 1901)
- 1954 – Claude Delvincourt, French pianist and composer (born 1888)
- 1955 – Tibor Szele, Hungarian mathematician (born 1918)
- 1956 – William Titt, British gymnast (born 1881)
- 1958 – Prince Ferdinand of Bavaria (born 1884)
- 1958 – Ásgrímur Jónsson, Icelandic painter (born 1876)
- 1958 – Isidora Sekulić, Serbian writer (born 1877)
- 1961 – Nikolai Kryukov, Russian composer (born 1908)
- 1962 – Boo Kullberg, Swedish gymnast (born 1889)
- 1963 – Jacobus Oud, Dutch architect (born 1890)
- 1964 – James Chapin, American ornithologist (born 1889)
- 1964 – Aloïse Corbaz, Swiss artist (born 1886)
- 1964 – Douglas MacArthur, American general (born 1880)
- 1965 – Pedro Sernagiotto, Italian-Brazilian footballer (born 1908)
- 1965 – Sándor Szalay, Hungarian figure skater (born 1893)
- 1967 – Mischa Elman, Ukrainian-American violinist (born 1891)
- 1967 – Johan Falkberget, Norwegian author (born 1879)
- 1967 – Hermann Joseph Muller, American geneticist and academic, Nobel Prize laureate (born 1890)
- 1967 – Herbert Johnston, British runner (born 1902)
- 1968 – Félix Couchoro, Togolese writer (born 1900)
- 1968 – Lajos Csordás, Hungarian footballer (born 1932)
- 1968 – Giuseppe Paris, Italian gymnast (born 1895)
- 1969 – Alberto Bonucci, Italian actor and director (born 1918)
- 1969 – Rómulo Gallegos, Venezuelan novelist and politician (born 1917)
- 1969 – Ain-Ervin Mere, Estonian SS officer (born 1903)
- 1970 – Louisa Bolus, South African botanist and taxonomist (born 1877)
- 1970 – Alfred Sturtevant, American geneticist and academic (born 1891)
- 1970 – Karl von Spreti, German diplomat (born 1907)
- 1971 – José Cubiles, Spanish pianist and conductor (born 1894)
- 1972 – Isabel Jewell, American actress and singer (born 1907)
- 1973 – David Murray, British race car driver (born 1909)
- 1973 – Alla Tarasova, Russian ballerina (born 1898)
- 1974 – Bino Bini, Italian fencer (born 1900)
- 1974 – A. Y. Jackson, Canadian painter (born 1882)
- 1975 – Tell Berna, American middle and long-distance runner (born 1891)
- 1975 – Victor Marijnen, Dutch politician (born 1917)
- 1975 – Chiang Kai-shek, Chinese general and politician, 1st President of the Republic of China (born 1887)
- 1975 – Harold Osborn, American track and fielder (born 1899)
- 1976 – Howard Hughes, American pilot, engineer, and director (born 1905)
- 1976 – Wilder Penfield, American-Canadian surgeon and academic (born 1891)
- 1976 – Harry Wyld, British cyclist (born 1900)
- 1977 – Carlos Prío Socarrás, President of Cuba, (born 1903)
- 1977 – Yuri Zavadsky, Russian actor and director (born 1894)
- 1981 – Émile Hanse, Belgian footballer (born 1892)
- 1981 – Bob Hite, American singer-songwriter (born 1945)
- 1981 – Pinchus Kremegne, French artist (born 1890)
- 1982 – Abe Fortas, American lawyer and jurist (born 1910)
- 1983 – Abd al-Quddus al-Ansari, Saudi Arabian historian, journalist and writer. (born 1907)
- 1984 – Hans Lunding, Danish military officer (born 1899)
- 1984 – Giuseppe Tucci, Italian scholar of oriental cultures (born 1894)
- 1986 – Manly Wade Wellman, American writer (born 1903)
- 1987 – Leabua Jonathan, 2nd Prime Minister of Lesotho (born 1914)
- 1988 – Alf Kjellin, Swedish actor and director (born 1920)
- 1989 – Frank Foss, American pole vaulter (born 1895)
- 1989 – Karel Zeman, Czech director, artist, production designer and animator (born 1910)
- 1991 – Sonny Carter, American soccer player, physician, and astronaut (born 1947)
- 1991 – Jay Miller, American basketball player (born 1943)
- 1991 – Jiří Mucha, Czech journalist, writer and screenwriter (born 1915)
- 1991 – William Sidney, 1st Viscount De L'Isle (born 1909)
- 1991 – John Tower, American soldier, academic, and politician (born 1925)
- 1992 – Takeshi Inoue, Japanese footballer (born 1928)
- 1992 – Molly Picon, American actress (born 1898)
- 1992 – Sam Walton, American businessman, founded Walmart and Sam's Club (born 1918)
- 1993 – Divya Bharti, Indian actress (born 1974)
- 1994 – Kurt Cobain, American singer-songwriter and guitarist (born 1967)
- 1995 – Nicolaas Cortlever, Dutch chess player (born 1915)
- 1995 – Emilio Greco, Italian sculptor and engraver (born 1913)
- 1995 – Christian Pineau, French Resistance fighter (born 1904)
- 1996 – Charlene Holt, American actress (born 1928)
- 1997 – Allen Ginsberg, American poet (born 1926)
- 1998 – Charles Frank, British theoretical physicist (born 1911)
- 1998 – Cozy Powell, English drummer (born 1947)
- 1999 – Giulio Einaudi, Italian book publisher (born 1912)
- 2000 – Heinrich Müller, Austrian footballer (born 1909)
- 2000 – Lee Petty, American race car driver (born 1914)
- 2001 – Aldo Olivieri, Italian footballer (born 1910)
- 2002 – Layne Staley, American singer-songwriter (born 1967)
- 2002 – Kim Won-gyun, North Korean composer and politician (born 1917)
- 2003 – Keizo Morishita, Japanese painter (born 1944)
- 2004 – Fernand Goyvaerts, Belgian footballer (born 1938)
- 2004 – Sławomir Rawicz, Polish lieutenant (born 1915)
- 2004 – Heiner Zieschang, German mathematician and academic (born 1936)
- 2005 – Saul Bellow, Canadian-American novelist, essayist and short story writer, Nobel Prize laureate (born 1915)
- 2005 – Robert Borg, American military officer and equestrian (born 1913)
- 2005 – Chung Nam-sik, South Korean footballer (born 1917)
- 2006 – Allan Kaprow, American painter and educator (born 1927)
- 2006 – Gene Pitney, American singer-songwriter (born 1940)
- 2006 – Yevgeny Seredin, Russian swimmer (born 1958)
- 2006 – Pasquale Macchi, Roman Catholic archbishop (born 1923)
- 2007 – Maria Gripe, Swedish journalist and author (born 1923)
- 2007 – Leela Majumdar, Indian author and academic (born 1908)
- 2007 – Werner Maser, German historian and journalist (born 1922)
- 2007 – Mark St. John, American guitarist (born 1956)
- 2007 – Thomas Stoltz Harvey, American pathologist (born 1912)
- 2008 – Charlton Heston, American actor, director, and political activist (born 1923)
- 2009 – I. J. Good, British mathematician (born 1916)
- 2010 – Vitaly Sevastyanov, Soviet cosmonaut and engineer (born 1935)
- 2011 – Baruch Samuel Blumberg, American physician and geneticist, Nobel Prize laureate (born 1925)
- 2011 – Ange-Félix Patassé, Central African politician (born 1937)
- 2012 – Ferdinand Alexander Porsche, German designer (born 1935)
- 2012 – Pedro Bartolomé Benoit, Dominican Republican politician military officer (born 1921)
- 2012 – Jim Marshall, English businessman, founded Marshall Amplification (born 1923)
- 2012 – Barney McKenna, Irish musician (born 1939)
- 2012 – Bingu wa Mutharika, Malawian economist and politician, 3rd President of Malawi (born 1934)
- 2013 – Regina Bianchi, Italian actress (born 1921)
- 2013 – Piero de Palma, Italian tenor and actor (born 1924)
- 2013 – Nikolaos Pappas, Greek Navy admiral (born 1930)
- 2014 – Alan Davie, Scottish saxophonist and painter (born 1920)
- 2014 – Mariano Díaz, Spanish cyclist (born 1939)
- 2014 – Peter Matthiessen, American novelist, short story writer, editor, co-founded The Paris Review (born 1927)
- 2014 – John Pinette, American comedian (born 1964)
- 2014 – José Wilker, Brazilian actor, director, and producer (born 1947)
- 2015 – Fredric Brandt, American dermatologist and author (born 1949)
- 2015 – Juan Carlos Cáceres, Argentinian singer and pianist (born 1936)
- 2016 – Koço Kasapoğlu, Turkish footballer (born 1936)
- 2017 – Attilio Benfatto, Italian cyclist (born 1943)
- 2017 – Arthur Bisguier, American chess Grandmaster (born 1929)
- 2017 – Paul G. Comba, Italian-American computer scientist and astronomer (born 1926)
- 2017 – Makoto Ōoka, Japanese poet and literary critic (born 1931)
- 2017 – Paul O'Neill, American rock composer and producer (born 1956)
- 2017 – Tim Parnell, British race car driver (born 1932)
- 2017 – Memè Perlini, Italian actor and director (born 1947)
- 2017 – Atanase Sciotnic, Romanian sprint canoeist (born 1942)
- 2017 – Ilkka Sinisalo, Finnish ice hockey player (born 1958)
- 2018 – Isao Takahata, Japanese director (born 1935)
- 2019 – Sydney Brenner, South African biologist, Nobel Prize laureate (born 1927)
- 2019 – Wowaka, Japanese musician (born 1987)
- 2021 – Paul Ritter, English actor (born 1966)
- 2022 – Nehemiah Persoff, Israeli-American actor (born 1919)
- 2022 – Jimmy Wang Yu, Taiwanese actor (born 1943)
- 2024 – C. J. Snare, American musician and songwriter (born 1959)

== Holidays and observances ==
- Christian feast day:
  - Agape, Chionia, and Irene
  - Albert of Montecorvino
  - Catherine of Palma
  - Derfel Gadarn
  - Æthelburh of Kent
  - Gerald of Sauve-Majeure
  - Juliana of Liège
  - Maria Crescentia Höss
  - Blessed Mariano de la Mata
  - Pandita Mary Ramabai (Episcopal Church (USA))
  - Ruadhán of Lorrha
  - Vincent Ferrer
  - April 5 (Eastern Orthodox liturgics)
- Cold Food Festival, held on April 4 if it is a leap year (China); and its related observances:
- Earliest day on which Sham el-Nessim can fall, while May 9 is the latest; celebrated on Monday after the Orthodox Easter (Egypt)
- Children's Day (Palestinian territories)
- First Contact Day (International observance)
- Sikmogil (South Korea)
- National Maritime Day is observed in India, in commemoration of the first voyage of SS Loyalty of the Scindia Steam Navigation Company Ltd. in 1919.
- International Day of Conscience

== Other ==
- April the Fifth (1929–1954), British Thoroughbred racehorse
- Fiscal year § United Kingdom (ends 5 April)
