= Heinrich von Sybel =

German historian (1817–1895)

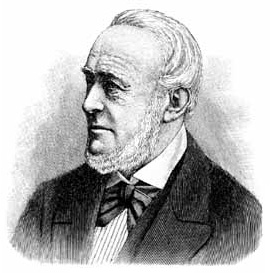

Prussian Landtag
- In office 1862–1864
- In office 1874–1880

Parliament of the North German Confederation
- In office 1867–1871

Personal details
- Born: Heinrich Karl Ludolf Sybel; 2 December 1817 Düsseldorf, Kingdom of Prussia
- Died: 1 August 1895 (aged 77) Marburg, Imperial Germany
- Occupation: Historian

Heinrich Karl Ludolf von Sybel (2 December 1817 – 1 August 1895) was a German historian and politician, who served in the Landtag of Prussia from 1862 to 1864 and from 1874 to 1880. He was a professor at the University of Bonn from 1861 to 1875 and director of the Prussian Archives from 1875.

== Life ==
Sybel came from a Protestant family which had long been established at Soest. He was born in Düsseldorf, where his father held important posts in the public service under both the French and the Prussians; in 1831 he was raised to the hereditary nobility. His home was one of the centres of the vigorous literary and artistic life for which Düsseldorf was renowned at that time. Sybel was educated at the local Gymnasium, and then at the University of Berlin, where he came under the influences of Friedrich Carl von Savigny and Leopold von Ranke, whose most distinguished pupil he was to become.

After taking his degree, he settled down in 1841 as a Privatdozent in history at the university of Bonn. He had already made himself known by critical studies on the history of the Middle Ages, of which the most important was his Geschichte des ersten Kreuzzuges (History of the First Crusade) (Düsseldorf, 1841; new ed., Leipzig, 1881), a work which, besides its merit as a valuable piece of historical investigation employing the critical methods he had learnt from Ranke, was also of some significance as a protest against the vaguely enthusiastic attitude encouraged by the Romantic school towards the Middle Ages. In 1861 Lady Duff-Gordon published an English translation of a part of this book, to which were added lectures on the crusades delivered in Munich in 1858, under the title History and Literature of the Crusades. This was followed by a study of the growth of German kingship (Die Entstehung des deutschen Königtums, Frankfurt, 1844, and again 1881), after which he was appointed professor.

In the same year (1844) Sybel became prominent as an opponent of the Ultramontane party. The exhibition of the Holy Shroud at Trier had attracted enormous numbers of pilgrims, and so, indignant at what appeared to him a fake, he assisted in publishing an investigation into the authenticity of the celebrated relic. From this time he began to take an active part in contemporary politics and in controversy as a strong but moderate Liberal. In 1846 he was appointed professor at Marburg, and though this small university offered little scope for his activities as a teacher, a seat in the Hessian Landtag gave him his first experience of politics. In 1848 he was present at Frankfurt, but he did not succeed in winning a seat for the National Assembly. His opposition to the extreme democratic and revolutionary party made him unpopular with the mob who broke his windows, and his liberalism made him suspect at court. He sat in the Erfurt parliament of 1850, and was attached to the Gotha party, which hoped for the regeneration of Germany through the leadership of Prussia.

During the period 1859–1866, Sybel was engaged in a literary controversy with the historian, Julius von Ficker, on the significance of the German Empire.

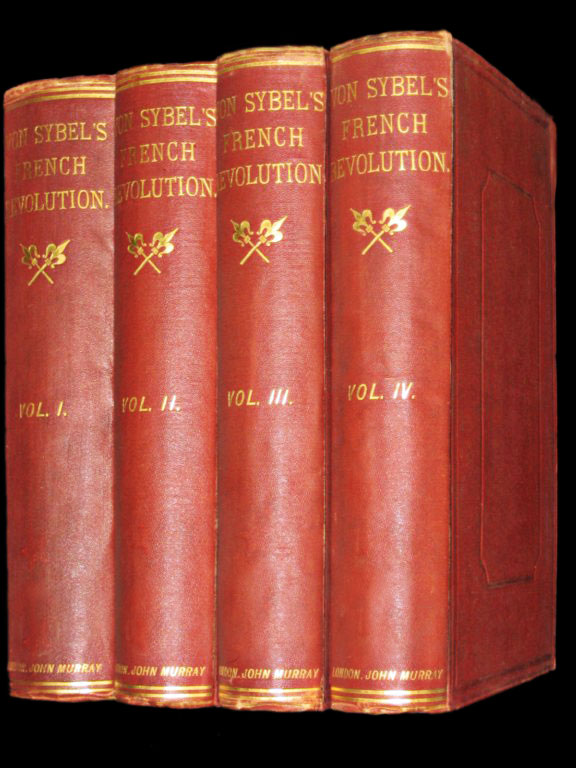
Von Sybel's French Revolution. First English edition by John Murray, London (1867)

During the years that followed he was occupied with his major chronicle of the French Revolution, Geschichte der Revolutionszeit 1789–1800, for which he had made prolonged studies in the archives of Paris and other countries. The later editions of the earlier volumes were enlarged and altered, and a new edition was published at Stuttgart in 1882. The first three volumes were translated into English by Walter Copland Perry (1867–1869). In this work he showed for the first time the connection between the internal and external history of France. By systematically studying the records, he was also the first to check and correct the traditional account of many episodes of France's internal history. He demonstrated that letters attributed to Marie Antoinette were not genuine. He undermined the influential revolutionary legends, expounded by French writers. Sybel was interested in Edmund Burke, on whom he had published two essays. The work was in fact the first attempt to substitute for the popular view of Thiers and Lamartine, a line which was later taken up by Taine and Albert Sorel.

In 1856, on the recommendation of Ranke, Sybel accepted the post of professor at Munich, where King Maximilian II of Bavaria, a generous patron of learning, hoped to establish a school of history. Here he found a fruitful field for his activity. Besides continuing his work on the Revolution and on the Middle Ages, he occupied himself fully with the Historical Seminar which he instituted; with the Historische Zeitschrift which he founded - the original model of the numerous historical periodicals which now exist – and as secretary of the new Historical Commission. Political differences soon interfered with his work; as a supporter of Prussia and a Protestant, especially as a militant champion against the Ultramontanes, he was from the first an object of suspicion to the Clerical party. In the political excitement which followed the war of 1859 he found that he could not hope for the unreserved support of the king, and therefore in 1861 he accepted a professorship at Bonn, which he held until 1875.

He was elected a member of the Prussian Lower House, and during the next three years was one of the most active members of that assembly. In several important debates he led the attack on the government, and opposed the policy of Bismarck, not only on finances but also on Polish and Danish affairs, in particular the impending crisis with Denmark over Schleswig and Holstein. In 1864 he did not stand for re-election, owing to an eye infection, but in 1866 he was one of the first to point out the way to a reconciliation between Bismarck and his former opponents. He had a seat in the Constituent Assembly of 1867, and while he joined the National Liberals he distinguished himself by opposing the introduction of universal suffrage, sharing the distrust of many Liberals over its effects. In 1874 he returned to the Prussian parliament in order to support the government in its conflict with the Clericals, and after 1878 with the Socialists. He explained and justified his position in two pamphlets that analysed the teaching of the Socialists and traced Clerical policy during the 19th century. In 1880 he retired, like so many other Liberals, disheartened by the change in political life which he blamed on universal suffrage.

In 1875, Bismarck appointed him to the post of director of the Prussian archives. Under his superintendence was begun the great series of publications, besides that of the correspondence of Frederick the Great, which he helped to edit. His last years were occupied with his great work, Die Begründung des deutschen Reiches durch Wilhelm I (The Founding of the German Empire under William I)(Munich, 1889–1894), a work of great importance on German unification, for which he was allowed to use the Prussian state papers and was therefore able to write a history of the greatest events of his own time with full access to highly secret sources of information. As a history of Prussian policy from 1860 to 1866 it is of incomparable value. After the fall of Bismarck permission to use the secret papers was withdrawn, and therefore vols. vi. and vii., which deal with the years 1866 to 1870, are of less importance. This work has been translated into English as The Founding of the German Empire, by M L Perrin and G Bradford (New York, 1890–1891). Sybel did not live to write an account of the war with France, dying at Marburg on 1 August 1895. His other writings include Die deutsche Nation und das Kaiserreich (1862) and a large number of historical articles.

Sybel left two sons, one of whom became an officer in the Prussian army; the other, Ludwig von Sybel (1846-1929), a professor of archaeology in the university of Marburg, was the author of several works dealing with Greek archaeology.

Some of Sybel's numerous historical and political essays have been collected in Kleine historische Schriften (3 vols, 1863, 1869, 1881; new ed., 1897); Vorträge und Aufsätze (Berlin, 1874); and Vorträge und Abhandlungen, published after his death with a biographical introduction by Conrad Varrentrapp (Munich, 1897).
