= Conrad Varrentrapp =

German historian (1844–1911)

Conrad Varrentrapp (17 August 1844, in Braunschweig 28 April 1911, in Marburg) was a German historian.

He studied at the University of Göttingen as a pupil of Georg Waitz and at the University of Berlin as a student of Leopold von Ranke. In 1865 he received his doctorate at the University of Bonn under the direction of Heinrich von Sybel. In 1868 he obtained his habilitation at Bonn, where in 1873 he became an associate professor. From 1867 to 1874 he was an editor of Sybel's Historische Zeitschrift.

In 1874 he was named a professor of medieval and modern history at the University of Marburg. In 1890 he relocated as a professor to the University of Strasbourg, then in 1901 returned to Marburg, where he served as director of historical seminars.

== Selected works ==
- Erzbischof Christian I. von Mainz, 1867 – Archbishop Christian I of Mainz.
- Beiträge zur Geschichte der Kurkölnischen Universität Bonn, 1868; Contributions to the history of the University of Bonn.
- Hermann von Wied und sein Reformationsversuch in Köln. Ein Beitrag zur deutschen Reformationsgeschichte, 1878 – Hermann von Wied and his reformation attempt in Cologne. A contribution to the German Reformation.
- Johannes Schulze und das höhere preussische Unterrichtswesen in seiner Zeit, 1889 – Johannes Schulze and higher Prussian education of his era.
- Landgraf Philipp von Hessen und die Universität Marburg, 1904; Landgrave Philip of Hesse and the University of Marburg.
