= Forces Elèctriques d'Andorra =

Electricity utility of Andorra

Andorran Electric Forces
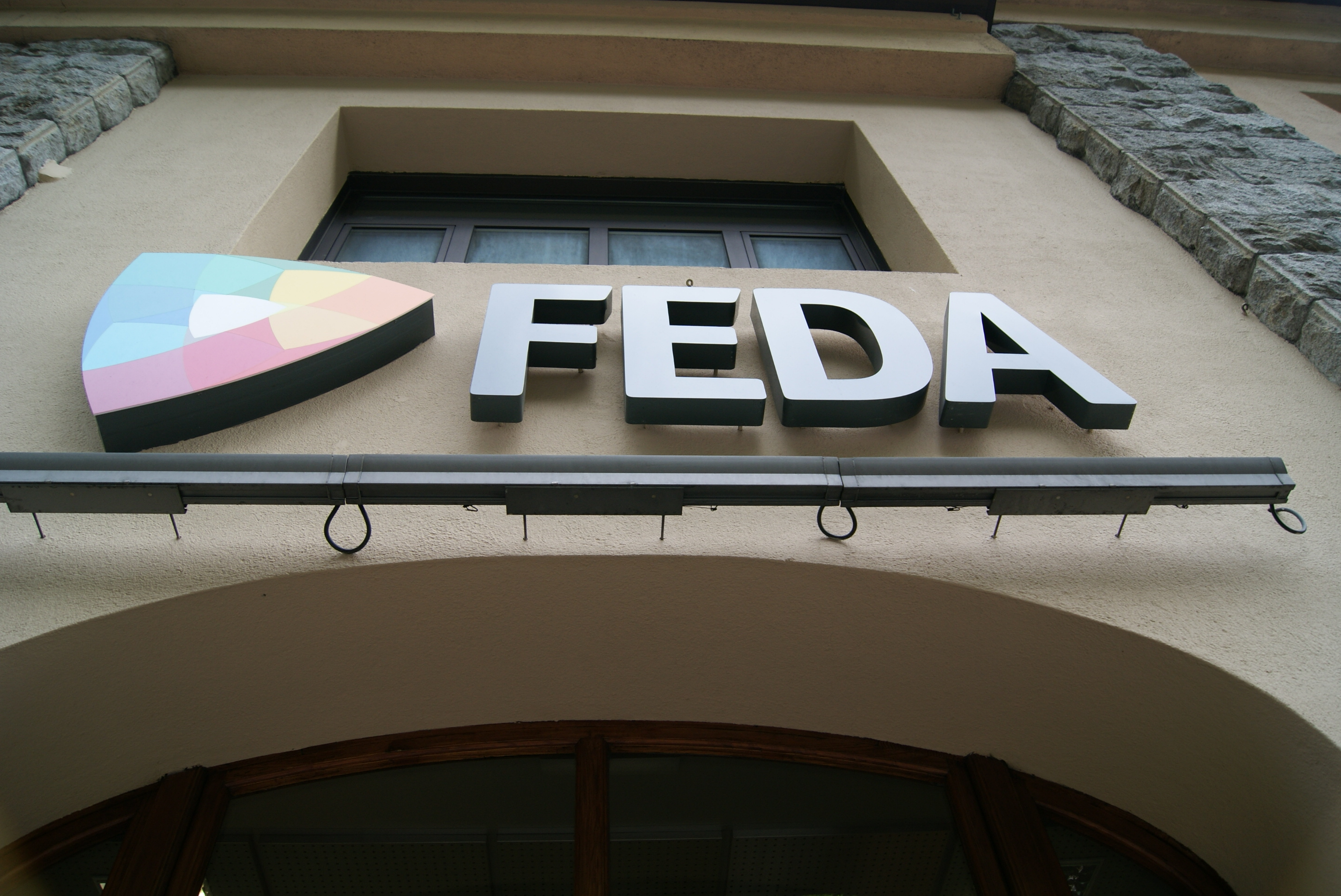
- Native name: Forces Elèctriques d'Andorra
- Industry: Electricity
- Predecessor: Forces Hidroelèctriques d'Andorra
- Headquarters: Andorra
- Website: www.feda.ad

Forces Elèctriques d'Andorra (FEDA; English: Andorran Electric Forces) is the company in charge of Andorra's electricity supply. Its direct predecessor was the Forces Hidroelèctriques d'Andorra (English: Andorran Hydroelectric Forces, FHASA), which was nationalized in 1988 by the General Council and converted into the FEDA.

The FHASA was known for the construction of the power plant in Engordany and the CG-1, as well as the FHASA strikes of 1933 which won universal male suffrage for Andorrans, until then limited to heads of household. The only three general strikes in the history of Andorra were all staged by the workers of the FHASA.
