= Unió Andorrana =

Political alliance during the Andorran Revolution

Andorran Union Unió Andorrana
- Founded: 5 April 1933
- Dissolved: 23 July 1934
- Split from: Joves Andorrans
- Headquarters: Canillo
- Ideology: Reformism; Souverainism; Syndicalism
- Political position: Left-wing
- Regional affiliation: CNT-FAI
- General Council (1933): 5 / 23

The Andorran Union (Catalan: Unió Andorrana, UA) was an Andorran political formation established in 1933, during the heat of the Andorran Revolution. The formation defended universal male suffrage, the creation of a status of Andorran nationality and the General Council that was dismissed by the French occupation forces.

== History ==
The party was created by the "Young Andorrans" (Catalan: Joves Andorrans, JA) in the midst of the 1933 revolution, after the threats of both co-princes to intervene in Andorran internal affairs after the approval of universal male suffrage by the General Council. The councilors who were part of this formation ran in the 1933 Andorran parliamentary election where, according to the data of the time, five general councilors from the Andorran Union were elected: one councilor in Les Escaldes and the remaining four in Canillo, where all the winning candidates were from this formation. Four additional seats were won by Andorran socialists, but the election of 14 general councilors from the conservative Integral Nationalist Group (Catalan: Grup Nacionalista Integral, GNI) meant the defeat of these ideas.
