= Keizo Morishita =

Japanese painter (1944–2003)

Keizo Morishita (Kitakyushu, 4 February 1944 – Milan, 5 April 2003) was a Japanese painter who lived most of his life in Italy.

== Academy and early years ==
Morishita was born in Kitakyūshū-shi, in the Fukuoka Prefecture in Japan. In 1963, at 19 years old, he obtained a scholarship and moved to Milan to study Arts. He attended Marino Marini’s classes at the Brera Fine Arts Academy, where he graduated in 1968. Although Morishita majored in sculpture, his elected medium was painting. His mixed cultural identity, paired with a great intellectual curiosity, prompted him to explore different strategies and procedures from the majority of his fellow students. In the early Sixties, Morishita had direct contact with the avant-garde art scene in milan, which was still linked with Spatialism. His first solo exhibition took place in 1967 at Galleria La Chiocciola in Padua.

== Artistic career ==
Throughout his career Morishita exhibited mostly in Italy, with exhibitions in Milan, Rome, Venice, Turin, Florence, Padua and Brescia. He also exhibited his work in Switzerland (Lugano and Geneva); France (Paris and Saint Tropez); Denmark (Copenhagen); Belgium (Ghent); England (Chester); Taiwan, China, Mexico, and Japan (Tokyo, Osaka, Nagoya, Niigata and his hometown Kitakyūshū). Many art critics and curators have written about his work, including Franco Russoli, Roberto Sanesi, Emilio Tadini, Valerio Adami, Ottavio Missoni, Milena Milani, Carlo Franza, Luigi Carluccio, Renzo Margonari, Walter Schönenberger, Taijin Tendo, Keiko Asako, Tani Arata and Rolly Marchi.

Morishita died on 5 April 2003 in Milan.

== Solo and group exhibitions ==
- 1967 - Galleria La Chiocciola, Padua
- 1969 - Galleria Richard Foncke, Ghent, Belgium
- 1970 - Studio Marconi, Milan
- 1972 - Galleria 42, Bologna
- 1972 - Galleria Barozzi Arte Contemporanea, Venice
- 1972 - Studio Paolo Barozzi, Milan
- 1972 - Studio Marconi, Milan
- 1973 - Galleria San Luca, Bologna
- 1973 - Galleria interarte, Genova
- 1974 - Galleria Il Triangolo, Pescara
- 1974 - Galleria La Chiocciola, Padua
- 1975 - Studio Marconi, Milan
- 1975 - Galleria Menghelli, Florence
- 1975 - Galleria San Luca, Bologna
- 1975 - Galleria Margherita, Taranto
- 1975 - Galleria Lanza, Intra
- 1975 - Galleria Richard Foncke, Ghent
- 1975 - Galleria Galliata, Alassio
- 1975 - Galleria il Tritone Dialoghi Club, Biella
- 1976 - Galleria Documenta, Turin
- 1976 - Galleria il Tritone Dialoghi Club, Biella
- 1977 - Gallerie L’Enseigne du Cerceau, Paris
- 1977 - Galleria La Chiocciola, Padua
- 1977 - Galleria Panchieri, Rovereto
- 1977 - Galerie Marie-Louise Jeanneret, Geneva
- 1978 - Galleria Dieci, Trieste
- 1978 - Galeria Lanza, Intra
- 1979 - Jiyugaoka Gallery, Tokyo
- 1979 - Ranka-Do Gallery, Osaka
- 1979 - Akira Ikeda Gallery, Nagoya
- 1980 - Studio Marconi, Milan
- 1980 - Seibu Departement Store Gallery, Tokyo
- 1980 - Ohfunato Dajichi Gallery, Ohfuriato
- 1980 - Head Art Gallery, Urawa
- 1980 - Gallerie Petit Formes Gallery, Osaka
- 1981 - Galleria Dialoghi Club, Biella
- 1981 - Azienda del Turismo Comune di Modena
- 1981 - Studio d’Ars, Milan
- 1982 - Chikugo Gallery, Kurume
- 1982 - Kuraya Gallery, Kitakyushu
- 1982 - Kumo Gallery, Tokyo
- 1982 - Jiyugaoka Gallery, Tokyo
- 1982 - Koh Gallery, Tokyo
- 1982 - Banco Santo Spirito, Rome
- 1983 - Galleria Lanza, Intra
- 1983 - 505 Gallery, Tokyo
- 1983 - Gallery Chimeria, Tokyo
- 1983 - Studio Marconi, Milan
- 1983 - Galleria Dialoghi Club, Biella
- 1983 - Galleria Nove Colonne, Trento
- 1984 - Galleria Il Salotto, Como
- 1984 - Galleria La Chiocciola, Padua
- 1984 - Ginza Gallery, Tokyo
- 1984 - Studio Malpensata, Lugano
- 1984 - Galleria Passardi, Lugano
- 1985 - Studio F.22, Palazzolo
- 1985 - Ginza Gallery, Tokyo
- 1985 - Kumo Gallery, Tokyo
- 1985 - Kodoshia Gallery, Inchionoseki
- 1985 - Galleria Waldhause, Sils-Maria
- 1986 - Casa della Cultura Gobierno Estado de Puebla, Mexico City
- 1986 - Rafael Matos Galeria de Arte, Mexico City
- 1986 - Artestudio 36, Lecce
- 1987 - Asia Art Gallery, Taipei
- 1988 - Studio F.22, Palazzolo
- 1989 - Villa Berlucchi, Franciacorta
- 1990 - Studio F.22, Palazzolo
- 1990 - Galleria La Bussola, Turin
- 1991 - Galleria Eight Street, Tokyo
- 1992 - Galeri Ægidus, Randers, Denmark
- 1993 - Tenju-en Museum, Nijgata
- 1993 - Hambara-Hanga Museum, Mizunami-shi
- 1993 - Hara Museurn Arc, Shibukawa-shi
- 1994 - Città di Osimo
- 1994 - Big&Great, Palazzo Martinengo, Brescia
- 1994 - Studio F.22, Palazzolo
- 1995 - Gallery Apa, Nagoja
- 1995 - Kunngi Gallery, Tokyo
- 1996 - Galleria La Bussola, Turin
- 1996 - Città di Castelmaggiore, Cremona
- 1996 - Studio F.22, Palazzolo
- 1997 - Convento dell ‘ Annunciata, Rovato Brescia
- 1998 - Galleria Artestudio, Milan
- 1998 - Museo d’Arte Moderna, Gazoldo degli Ippoliti
- 1998 - Spazio Cultura, Milena Milani, Cortina d’Ampezzo
- 1998 - Studio F.22, Palazzolo
- 1998 - Museo d’ Arte Moderna, Gazoldo degli Ippoliti M
- 1999 - Galleria Anna Osemont, Albissola
- 1999 - General Consulate of Japan, Milan
- 1999 - Studio F.22, Palazzolo
- 2000 - Galleria del Naviglio, Milan
- 2000 - Galleria del Naviglio, Venice
- 2000 - Galleria Giotto and Company, Vigevano
- 2000 - Priamar Arte, Savona
- 2000 - Cantine di Franciacorta, Erbusco
- 2000 - Studio F.22, Palazzolo
- 2001 - Kohln Rathaus, Cologne
- 2002 - Comune di Sesto Calende
- 2002 - Debbie’s Choice, Chester
- 2002 - Comune di Sondrio: Il colore dei sogni
- 2002 - Comune di Montagnana
- 2002 - Palazzo Pretorio, Sondrio
- 2002 - Atelier d’ Arte Savaia Albisola
- 2003 - Studio F.22, Palazzolo
- 2005 - Comune di Teglio
- 2006 - Studio F.22, Palazzolo
- 2006 - Comune di Cesena
- 2007 - Collezione d’arte contemporanea Lina Bortolon, Feltre
- 2009 - Studio F.22, Palazzolo
- 2010 - Atelier Giuseppe Ajmone, Carpignano Sesia.
