= International Day of Conscience =

Annual commemoration of human conscience

The International Day of Conscience is a global day of awareness celebrated on April 5, commemorating the importance of human conscience. It was established by the United Nations General Assembly on July 25, 2019, with the adoption of UN resolution 73/329. The first International Day of Conscience was celebrated on April 5, 2020.
