= Andorran Revolution =

1933 pro-democracy uprising in Andorra

- Native name: Revolució del 1933
- English name: Revolution of 1933
- Date: April 5, 1933 – July 23, 1934
- Location: Andorra
- Motive: Universal male suffrage
- Organised by: Young Andorrans
- Participants: Young Andorrans, FHASA workers
- Outcome: Universal male suffrage achieved; 1933 Andorran parliamentary election held; passage of the Andorran Constitution of 1934

The Andorran Revolution, also known as the Revolution of 1933, was a democratic uprising led by the Young Andorrans (a trade union related to the CNT-FAI) that called for political reforms, universal suffrage for all Andorrans and acted in defense of the rights of local and foreign workers during the construction of FHASA's hydroelectric power station in Encamp. On April 5, 1933, the Young Andorrans seized the Andorran Parliament. These actions were preceded by the arrival of Colonel René-Jules Baulard with 50 gendarmes and the mobilization of 200 local militias or sometent led by the Síndic Francesc Cairat.

== History ==
=== Context ===
The interwar period in Andorra was characterized by a continuation of the economic crisis that arose in the second half of the 19th century. The country lived very precariously on the economy of the Ancien Regime. Although an attempt was made to outsource the economy, it did not take off and waves of emigration continued to decimate the population and its activity. Over time, the interwar period in Andorra meant an extension of the popular revolts and noble uprisings of the previous decade.

It was at this time that the country saw a wave of protests with which, for the first time, it was possible to implement universal male suffrage – authorized only to men of legal age (over 21 years) and Andorran nationality. This was an unprecedented fact because before that the country was still living under the New Reformation regime. Although it was a step forward to approve it, the New Reformation was completely obsolete and inadequate with the turn of the twentieth century. It continued to give the votes to a privileged few and did not contemplate the participation of women. This meant that the bulk of the population was excluded from being able to participate in the country's politics.

The waves of Andorrans fleeing the Andorran economic situation to settle in France or Catalonia lead Andorran politics to see the so-called Revolution of 1933. From outside the associations of Andorran emigrants virulently criticized the Andorran government's policy, through newspapers they brought new liberal and capitalist currents to Andorra. The General Council wanted to censor the opinion that was published abroad because it questioned the New Reformation.

Andorran politicians wanted to show that Andorra was a "bucolic" place, with the aim of avoiding any kind of foreign interference in Andorran affairs. The government tried to ban the collection of signatures that the emigrants carried out in Andorra, to give the right to vote to all adults and change the Constitution to transform Andorra into a constitutional monarchy. From Catalunya there was widespread support for this change of regime and thanks to each other, the Pariatges and their feudal character began to be criticized for the first time. The establishment of the Spanish Republic did not change Castilian ambitions towards Andorra. The country continued to be treated as part of Spanish territory. Spain sought to eradicate the co-principality, while France tried to preserve it.

The construction of the FHASA hydroelectric plant changed the country's economic course. The project was conceived as a mechanism for modernizing the country and economic activation. Its presence did not broadly change the country's politics, although it allowed the entry of new ideological currents that until then had never set foot in Andorran soil: socialism, communism and anarcho-syndicalism.

The universal suffrage granted to men managed to be approved, but the Spanish Civil War and subsequent Second World War stopped the modernization and economic activation of Andorra.

==== French and Spanish imperialism ====
France and Spain have always considered Andorra their territory. It has been disputed practically since Andorra obtained the Pariatge. The beginning of the era of nationalism did not change this situation much. Castile within its concept of pan-Hispanic nationalism dubbed Andorra an Hispanic territory. France, within its concept of "natural borders", treated Andorra as a French protectorate.

The protectorate is one of the two control systems chosen by France during colonization. The colonized nation was either managed as a protectorate or depended directly on the Department of the Ministry of the Colonies. The protectorate accepted local sovereignty but forced it to have a French governor and accept the dirigisme of the Ministry of Foreign Affairs.

The Andorran protectorate regime made the governor the vicar and representative of the co-prince which should normally correspond. 20th century Andorrans had to register in France and the passport granted to them was protected by France.

Influenced by Catalanism, which found it incongruous that Andorra continues to be a fief, many Andorrans were taking steps to recognize Andorra as a separate nation-state. This is how the General Council addressed the League of Nations during the 1930s so that it could intervene in the Andorran affair in view of the paternalistic attitudes of Spain and France. At this time, Andorra achieved the Andorran national regime, which did not differ much from the national regime in the French colonies.

Spain claimed its "right to conquest" over Andorra and for this reason tried to influence education. Spain wanted to ban the Catalan Andorran schools. The desire to be and be independent ends up in the mood of Andorrans. Wanting to edit their own labels, looking to introduce a national system, would command on the Spanish school teachers looking to enter the Catalan school, addressing the United Nations, among others, are examples clear that Andorra did not want to belong to either side.

==== Catalan and Andorran nationalism ====
The Andorran position towards Catalanism was open, because many Andorrans defended the right of Catalans to self-determination, but contained, because the pan-Hispanic and pan-French projects clearly endangered the ill-defined status of Andorra. Although from Catalunya, Andorra was seen as a separate and admirable country as it was the only independent Catalan state, this independence was more de jure than de facto. The refusal of the League of Nations to accept Andorra as a full member exemplified this.

Andorrans felt and saw themselves as a separate country. None of this meant that Andorran politicians had to play the game of ambiguity to preserve the status of a territory that is being challenged everywhere. The Catalan press reported on various occasions that it was necessary to get rid of the Pariatges and transform the Andorran state into a republican regime. The currents of the time influenced many Andorrans and for this reason there were many who were committed to the Republic and the self-determination of Catalonia.

France and Spain never accepted the Andorrans in favor of the Andorran republic. Any republican claim was interpreted by these two states as a direct influence of Catalanism. Both averse to any right to self-determination, France and Spain often left their differences aside to impose their will on the Andorran parliament, to avoid progress in the Andorran territory.

For the representatives of the French co-prince, independence was a purely anti-French attitude, no matter where it came from, from Catalonia as much as from the colonies or Andorra.

One particular episode and that says a lot about Franco-Spanish policy towards Catalans and Andorrans is the case of Andres Lopez Massó, minister of Education, delegate of Madrid and a convinced Catalanist. The General Council maintained a double face at all times. He was first elected by the General Council to act as a lawyer-adviser to parliament. In this task, he created links with the president of the Catalan government, Francesc Macià, so that he could invest in the country's education. The General Council was completely pleased with its educational policy. Proof of this is the salary increase. When Macià withdrew the subsidies,[...] Andreu was forcibly dismissed without the consent of the Andorran parliament. [...] France and Spain did not tolerate Andreu introducing Catalan in schools or positioning himself in favor of a new Constitution. France saw Catalanist "coups d'etat" in the person of Andreu.

=== Reasons for the Revolution ===
==== Grievances ====
Changes in the co-principality regime were vehemently demanded to advance the country's policy to improve the actions taken against the economic crisis. In addition, the Andorran parliament found itself in a series of situations that were contrary to the free exercise of its sovereignty. France and the Vatican repeatedly limited the action of parliament, questioning any decision. Decisions made by parliament that were interfered with include:

- parliament granted the concession to a foreign betting agency to bet on horse racing in exchange for an annual payment. The aim was to build a hospital, a residence for the godparents of the country, spas, etc. The permanent delegates of the co-princes annulled the decision taken by parliament,
- Spain established the first secular schools. Public education was within the power of parliament, so it asked for a subsidy from Spain. But the bishop did not accept it and refused because he wanted the church to continue controlling the school system,
- parliament appointed a delegate, Andreu Massó i López, close to the Catalan government to support Catalan-language education in Andorra. But as Andreu was a Catalanist, France rejected his appointment and the co-princes expelled him,
- the delivery of mail between Spain and France was not well received by the parliament, which requested the entry of the country as an autonomous member of the corresponding international body, without consulting the co-princes,
- the parliament refused to recognize the appointment of the episcopal notary,
- the parliament commissioned a study for a civil registry in the principality, a prerogative that belonged to the records of each parish, which were under the order of the bishop,
- a parliamentary committee presented in 1933, to the French permanent delegate, a petition with 240 signatures for the establishment of universal male suffrage. The Permanent Delegate replied by shouting at the General Council for reasons unrelated to the plea.
- parliament agreed to draft a Constitution for the country in 1933, but the bishop did not agree

=== Areas of change ===
==== The abolition of tithes and the rectification of the economic situation ====
During the interwar period, tithes were abolished and, thanks to this, the country was freed from heavy taxes that did not allow the Andorran parliament to invest in the country's economic activity. In addition, the abolition of this feudal tax allows Andorra to advance a little further in the field of democracy.

The economic crisis dragged on in the second half of the 19th century and finally came to an end thanks to the construction of Andorra's Hydroelectric Forces, a Public Limited Company. The desired tertiarization of the country needed to open the way in and out of the national territory. Without this there was no way to invest in other fields. Communications in Andorra became a battlefield in the interwar period. If in other countries the Industrial Revolution was synonymous with railways, in Andorra it was called roads.

Road construction needed money and the Andorran parliament did not have it. It was for this reason that during the interwar period it took important steps that led to the abolition of tithes due to the episcopal co-prince. Through the constitution of the Administrative Board of Roads an attempt was made to build the first roads with public money. Put to work, the Andorran administration realized that it had no capacity to continue. The lack of resources led to the abolition of tithes in the Mitra. The diocese of Urgell refused, until the Road Board finally managed to reason with him. The co-prince saw in this request another way to deprive him of his right to be co-sovereign of Andorra.

Despite the abolition of tithes, the Andorran parliament only managed to pave a three-meter-wide path between Soldeu and Pas de la Casa. The board had to go back to the initial idea of concessions. In this second phase, the Andorran parliament decided to take advantage of the installation of power plants around the Pyrenees to attract foreign capital with which to get the country out of incommunicado detention. In 1929 the General Council granted a hydraulic energy company permission to produce electricity in Andorra in exchange for building roads there. (Note: The country has enjoyed electricity since the late 19th century. Flour mills and some sawmills were used to supply some private electricity.)

The 75-year concession of FHASA (Forces Hidroelèctriques d'Andorra) to the businessman Boussac i Llorenç Gómez in 1929 finally meant entering the capitalist world and the Industrial Revolution. In 1933 the company complied and built a road from Andorra la Vella to the French border and in 1934 from Andorra la Vella to Ordino. The electrification of the country allowed an important leap for Andorrans. The first banks, police and radios were installed,

==== The campaign for universal male suffrage ====
Andorran immigrants from Barcelona collected signatures in Andorra with the aim of approving the universal suffrage granted to men of legal age and Andorran nationality. They created a magazine that spread opinion in the country and an association to support its initiatives from Andorra. The law in Andorra prohibited all kinds of associations and did not explicitly provide for freedom of expression.

Due to this the collection was completely complicated:

- The magazine was censored by the Andorran parliament
- Young Andorrans had to meet in secret
- Signature collection campaigns were closed
- The Andorran administration banned all propaganda pamphlets

The bans did not get the Andorran Youth to retreat. For this reason, the Andorran parliament agreed to accept the signatures. But parliament knew that a decision like that would be rejected by the co-princes, who did so simply because in France the streets were on fire because the government there also did not want to give citizens the right to vote. The French pannational project would not accept a decision taken by the Andorran parliament that approved a vote extension. Thus, the Andorran parliament avoided, on the one hand, the criticism against it for not wanting to authorize the right to vote and the collection of signatures, and on the other hand, it also pointed to the list of grievances as another cause for criticizing the co-princes.

On January 17, 1933, a delegation from the General Council addressed the permanent delegates of the co-prince in Perpignan to present the application. The permanent delegation shouted at the Andorran delegation for trying to re-install casinos in the country and for extending the telephone lines, that France and Spain were disputing, without having previously communicated to the French co-prince. (Note: The installation of telephone lines in Andorra was the subject of new meetings between Andorra, Spain and France. Through its installation, France and Spain intended to continue with pan-national politics, while Andorra sought to make its own decisions on the lines, considering that this was in its jurisdiction as the representatives of popular sovereignty.)

The request for extending the right to vote was accepted by France but it warned that it would be necessary before asking for the opinion of the episcopal co-prince under the Pariahs. Parliament interpreted a refusal and told the population that the delegations of the co-princes were opposed. The French delegation decided to send the proposal directly to Co-Prince Albert Lebrun and inform him that it should be approved but that it should first be consulted with the population itself, by organizing a popular consultation.

==== The FHASA strikes ====
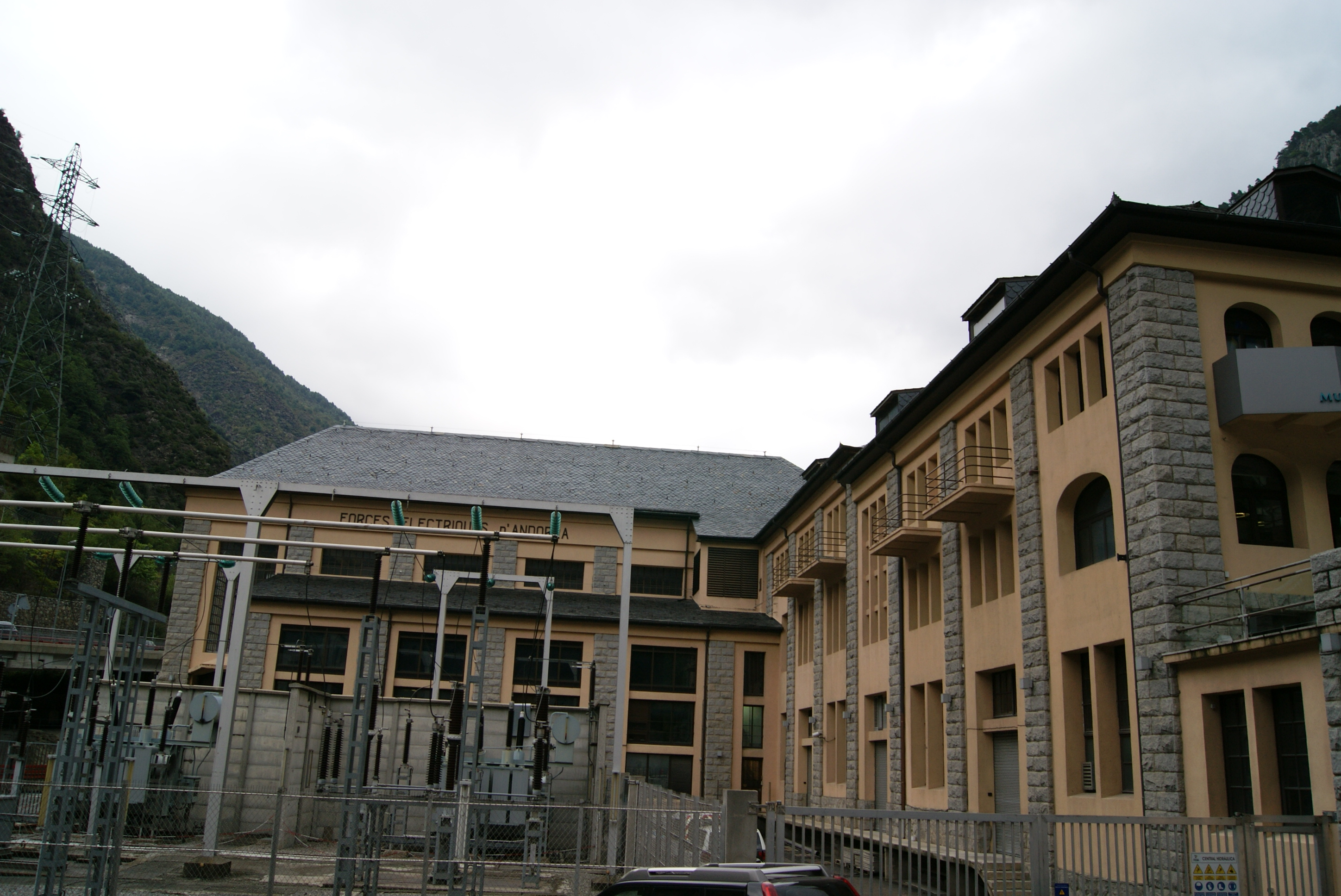
Old FHASA building, now transformed into the Museum of Electricity.

The construction of the hydroelectric power plant needed a significant mass of workers. The company hired more than two thousand workers. To reactivate domestic economic activity, the General Council wanted the company to hire Andorran staff. But in the end, much labor would be Spanish, French, Catalan or Galician. Most of the technical positions, by contrast, were Swiss. Working conditions were terrible. The company increased working hours without consensus or agreement, workers had no days off or breaks, worked for an insufficient salary to survive, there were no hygienic conditions, etc. Some ended up staying in the country, others left. There was a clear difference between the workers and technicians. The technicians earned twice as much as those who risked their lives building the plant.

It is these living conditions typical of the initial introduction of capitalism that Andorra seeks new ideological currents that until then had never set foot in national territory. The workers of the power station belonged mostly to the Catalan Regional Labor Confederation, a subsidiary of the CNT, the anarchist union. Catalan unions supported the demands of the power plant workers, who demanded decent living, hygiene and working conditions.

The Andorran parliament, which was made up of a bourgeois upper class, never saw the need to regulate the labor market and saw the workers' demands as a threat to the disappearance of the co-principality regime, with clear wills to transform Andorra into a Republic. The Andorran Youth Association joined the demands of the FHASA workers and because of this, the parliament found another rival.

As immigration entered the country, it became the majority. The General Council had that unfounded fear of difference, of being taken from the country. It is logical to think that the changes of the twentieth century should permanently alter these attitudes.

Three successive strikes that took place between 1931 and 1933 lead the Andorran parliament to form the first national police force with the stated intention of repressing any strike or demonstration contrary to what was dictated by parliament.

The way in which the magazine Andorra Agrícola covered the events says a lot about the mentality of an era. Thus, according to this, the workers of FHASA held a meeting in 1933 with a "special character". They were "strongly opposed to the authorities" of the country, that is, to the General Council. The article continues, "in view of this act of rebellion, the Mayor Anton Tomàs, seconded by the head of the police, after having mobilized three hundred armed men, expelled all the leaders of said movement from the country, that is, the workers responsible for the strike. According to the article, they were expelled from the country and threatened to never return, under penalty of "being handed over as prisoners to the French authorities." According to the press, the Barcelona Union went there to unblock the situation. But the "authorities denied entry into Andorran territory, a civil guard was set up at the border, to prevent the return of the expelled disturbers".

=== The Revolution of 1933 ===
==== The coup d'etat ====
For the Young Andorrans, the consultations with the co-princes were seen as another way to wrap up the exchange, so as not to respond positively to the request. From their point of view, it was incongruous to have to ask the co-princes for approval when the Andorran people represented in parliament should make the decision. The Andorran delegations saw a form of vassalship and a waste of time. Sending personal letters among the co-princes was seen as one more way to waste even more time. The multitude of travel and bureaucratic letters was not necessary for a simple extension of the right to vote that had already been previously approved through a signature collection campaign.

For all this, the Young Andorrans, taking advantage of the fact that the Andorran police were busy repressing the FHASA strikes, burst into the Casa de la Vall on April 5, 1933, confiscating its keys, closing its doors and forcing parliament to approve the extension of the right to vote. The coup began with the reading of a manifesto in parliament:

- A "democratic constitution" that delimited the duties and obligations of the co-princes
- A constitution that guarantees the rights of the "Andorran people"
- "Freedom of conscience, thought and word"
- "Guarantee of individual and collective rights"
- Parliamentary sessions open to the public
- Voting age set at 23
- Approval of "universal male suffrage"
- Labor rights, female education, "teaching in Catalan, without vetoing any other language"

It started from then a tug-of-war with the General Council. Were it not for the usual interference, it was probable that the General Council would not yield. But it did and ended up approving the electoral reform from which universal male suffrage was established in Andorra. Young Andorrans began to spread the word.

==== The detachment of gendarmes ====
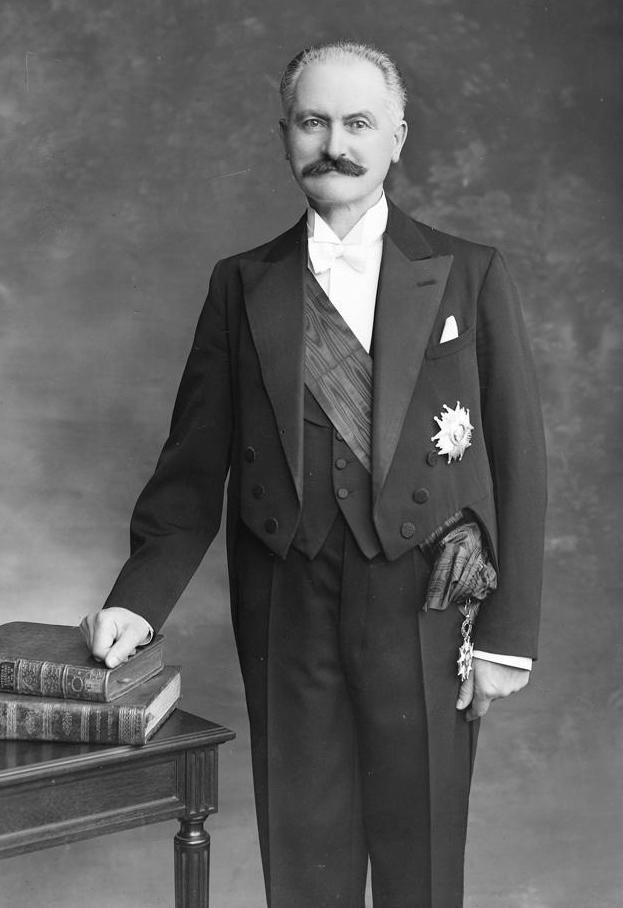
French co-prince Albert Lebrun.

The coup was very badly received by the delegations of the two co-princes. It was considered from France and the Vatican that its sovereignty was being disputed. That is, delegations did not tolerate an association being created with the power to make decisions over it. Moreover, they also did not accept the power of the Andorran parliament to approve the Law extending the right to vote. But the tug-of-war between parliamentarians and Young Andorrans bore fruit, the parliament agreed and ended up opposing the two co-princes of its own volition.

For everything, the French co-prince warned the parliament: either abolish the electoral reform or send a detachment of gendarmes to Andorra. The discrepancies are not saved and France finally sends its detachment of gendarmes. The Andorran parliament rebuked the French state for considering it as a subject and not as its own personality, which is why it decided to support electoral reform.

The bishop sent letters to Madrid to report that he did not agree at all with the coup and the attitude of the Andorran parliament. He wanted to send civil guards into the country, because in this way he would make it clear to France that the episcopal co-prince also commanded the country. In Madrid, he was replaced and the French state was accused of behaving badly against Andorra. Behind the accusations of an "evil" attitude was, above all, an advantage of the situation to take over Andorran territory. The Andorran parliament sent a letter to the Vatican, denouncing the abuse of the bishop of La Seu d'Urgell.

The co-princes dismiss the Andorran parliament and create a commission set up by Andorrans to manage the situation until calm is restored. In addition, they cut the economic supply of the parliament. France saw in the demand for more democracy a "Catalanist coup" in Andorra. All criticism was perceived by France as an "anti-French" attitude.

The commission never saw the light of day. The members who were to form it refused. Many Andorrans fled to take refuge in La Seu d'Urgell from where they appealed to the resistance. The gendarmes began to detain the Andorran authorities en-masse to force them to surrender, while they openly disobeyed. The fact that the Esquerra Republicana de Catalunya supported the revolt could explain why France saw a Catalanist coup d'état. But ERC simply wanted the establishment of a democracy in Andorra. However, thanks to ERC, the Basque press ended up leaking that a Swiss person would become the spokesman for the Andorran parliament at the League of Nations. Andorra defended that France was violating its rights and the latter replied that Andorra was not large enough to be considered a separate nation-state. Young Andorrans manage to gain international public opinion. The press, which saw no abnormality in demanding reforms like the one that the Andorran Youth wanted, reported serious criticism against the French state for its management of the conflict. Paris eventually gave in to public opinion.

The news about the riots in Andorra spread through the international press until it became news in the United States, Catalunya, Castile, Euskadi and France. President Franklin Roosevelt himself sent a letter to the Picart trustee to express his concern. At the same time, the British ambassador from Barcelona traveled to Andorra. There was direct talk of a real "revolution in Andorra". In the Catalan press there was clearly a very favorable position for Young Andorrans and the establishment of a Republic. The Spanish press had two positions: the pro-Catalan position was disclosed in the leftist press and the position against Catalan and in favor of maintaining a system of rank, was disclosed in the right-wing press. The French press was the most opposed and defended the French government by adopting the vocabulary of the state: "anti-French" elements. The British press published articles totally in favor of the revolt.

In general, the press harshly criticized the attitude of the two co-princes. The press described the attitude of the French state as belonging to the Salazar regime. Paris saw no alternative and resolved to hold new parliamentary elections by applying the universal male suffrage system.

==== The 1933 general election ====
In the elections, two rival camps ran. Those in favor of changing the co-principality regime and making Andorra a sovereign state with a constitutional monarchy and those opposed to all this. The former would like universal suffrage for men, the latter do not want it. Unió Andorrana constituted the reconversion of the Young Andorrans into a political party. Opponents took the form of the Integral Nationalist Group. (Note: The name "integral nationalist group" suggests today that those opposed to the Andorran Union were entirely in favor of French colonialist ideology. It was precisely the French far right that was vindicating itself at the time as an integral nationalist.)

The French gendarmerie remained patrolling Andorra by order of the co-prince. According to the official version, they had to guarantee calm, but the strikes in FHASA and the behavior of the Andorran and French police led them to conclude at that time that the gendarmerie were kept in place because they wanted to repress Andorran trade unionism. So much so that the beatings provided against FHASA protesters were popularly described as a "punitive expedition."

The elections ended up giving an overwhelming victory to Integral Nationalist Group. Andorrans living in Andorra had never experienced the radical changes that were taking place abroad and, therefore, it was more than likely that the change in mentality of Andorran emigrants was not the same as non-emigrants.

=== The Kingdom of Andorra ===
During the First World War, a communist regime was established in Russia. Supporters of the monarchy and absolutism fled en-masse due to the persecution given to them by the new regime. They are the so-called white émigrés. In Andorra there was never any communist regime and it was in no danger of falling into communism.

Boris Mikhalovich Skovirev-Mavrusov was a white Russian who had been born in the current capital of Lithuania. A polyglot, he served the Foreign Office until 1925 as a spy. He fled Russia when the 1917 revolution broke out. He sought political asylum, passed through the Netherlands, the United Kingdom and obtained a Nansen passport.

In 1933, Rodamón arrived in Andorran. He saw the situation of the Revolution of 1933 and took the opportunity to proclaim himself King of Andorra. The Andorran parliament agreed to make Andorra a business center. He told them that during his stay in the Netherlands he worked for the Dutch royal family. He even claimed that he had the title of Count of Orange. Establishes residence in the chalet of La Margineda in Andorra la Vella. Flattered, the parliament proclaims him king of Andorra and has a new Constitution drafted. 10,000 copies are distributed. (Note: Historians consider him an opportunistic adventurer. He is commonly called the "tambourine king". Borís is a very controversial figure in Andorra. The information available to historians is inconclusive. It is true that he was proclaimed king but everything surrounding his life is unknown. Information extracted from the Dutch police archives suggests that he was engaged in fraud in the Netherlands and that he was expelled from that country.)

He was expelled from Andorra by the co-princes after they saw the interviews he gave to The Times, Daily Herald and Ahora. France was immediately informed of the proclamation. On July 21, four civil guards and a sergeant were put in charge of expelling him.

== Bibliography ==
- Ministeri d'Educació, Joventut i Esports (1998). El segle xx a Andorra (in Catalan). Andorra: Govern d'Andorra. p. 4.
- Soriano, Amparo (2005). Andorra durant la guerra civil espanyola (in Catalan). Consell General. ISBN 99920-52-18-X.
- Armengol Aleix, Ester (2009). Andorra: un profund i llarg viatge (in Catalan). Govern d'Andorra. ISBN 978-99920-0-549-1.
- Guillamet Anton, Jordi (2009). Andorra: Nova aproximació a la història d'Andorra (in Catalan). Revista Altaïr. ISBN 978-84-936220-4-6.
- Gonzàlez i Vilalta, Andreu (2009). La cruïlla andorrana de 1933: la revolució de la modernitat (in Catalan). Fundació Julià Reig. ISBN 978-84-9791-497-0. Archived from the original on June 24, 2013.
- Planellas, Jordi (2013). Història Digital d'Andorra (in Catalan). Aloma Editors. ISBN 978-99920-66-02-7.
- Peruga Guerrero, Joan (1998). La crisi de la societat tradicional (S. XIX). Història, Geografia i Institucions d'Andorra (in Catalan). Editorial Andorrana. ISBN 99920-0-186-0.
- Segalàs, Alfred Llahí (2012). Històries de la nostra història. Un passeig per la història menys coneguda i anecdòtica del Principat d'Andorra (in Catalan). Andorra: 2+1 Editors. ISBN 9789992018972.
