= Thure de Thulstrup =

American illustrator (1848–1930)

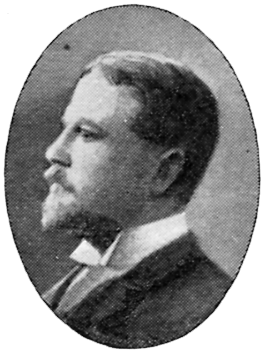
de Thulstrup in 1901

Thure de Thulstrup (born Bror Thure Thulstrup; April 5, 1848 – June 9, 1930) was a Swedish-born American illustrator with contributions for numerous magazines, including three decades of work for Harper's Weekly. He primarily illustrated historical military scenes.

== Early life and education ==
Thulstrup was born in Stockholm, Sweden, on April 5, 1848. His father was Sweden's Secretary of the Navy amongst other such positions.

After graduating from the Royal Swedish Military Academy, Thulstrup joined the Swedish military as an artillery officer at the age of twenty. However, he soon left Sweden for Paris, where he joined the French Foreign Legion and saw service in the Franco-Prussian War. Thulstrup also served in the French part of Northern Africa as a member of the First Zouave Regiment.

== Career ==
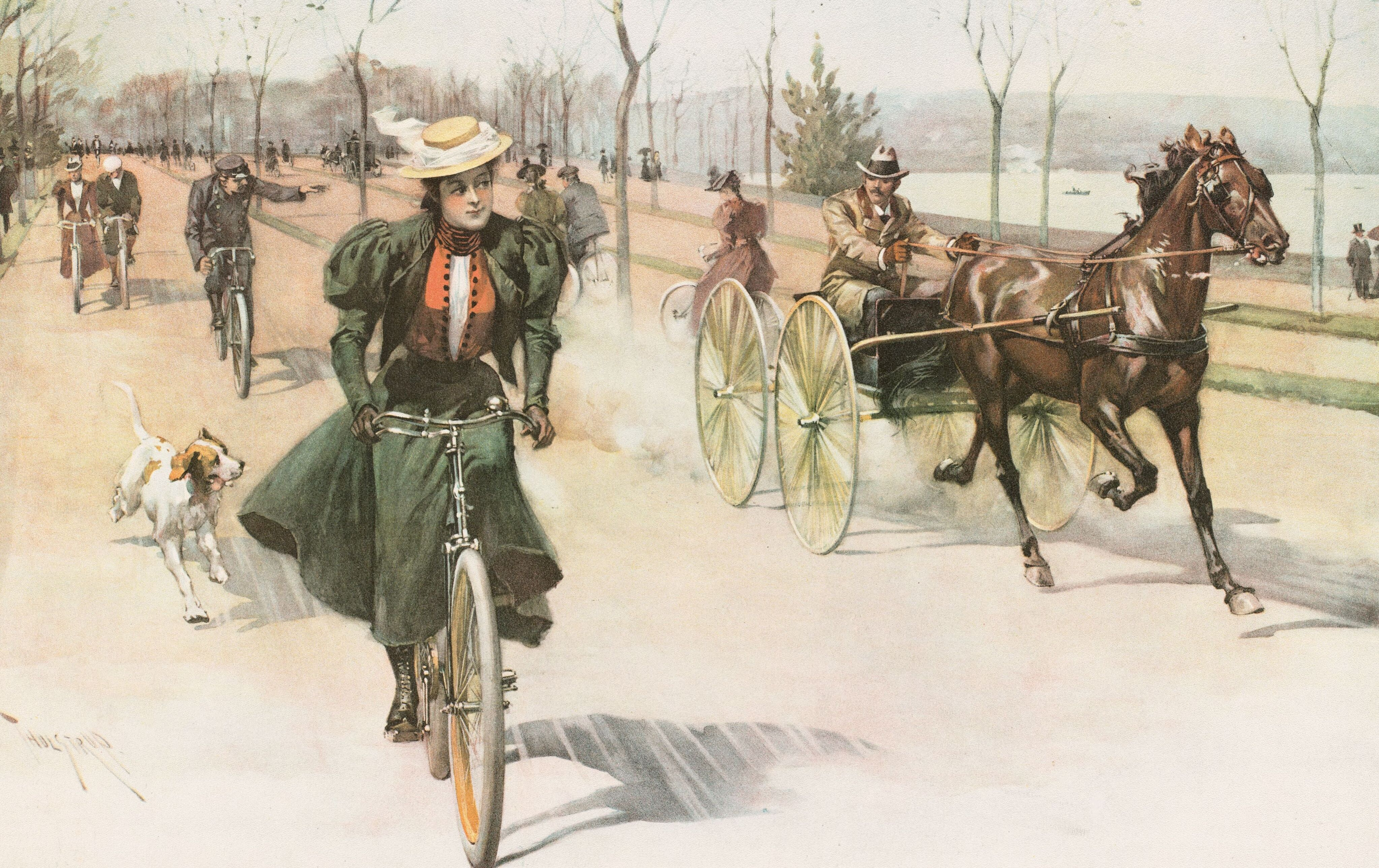
A brush on the Riverside Drive (c. 1897)

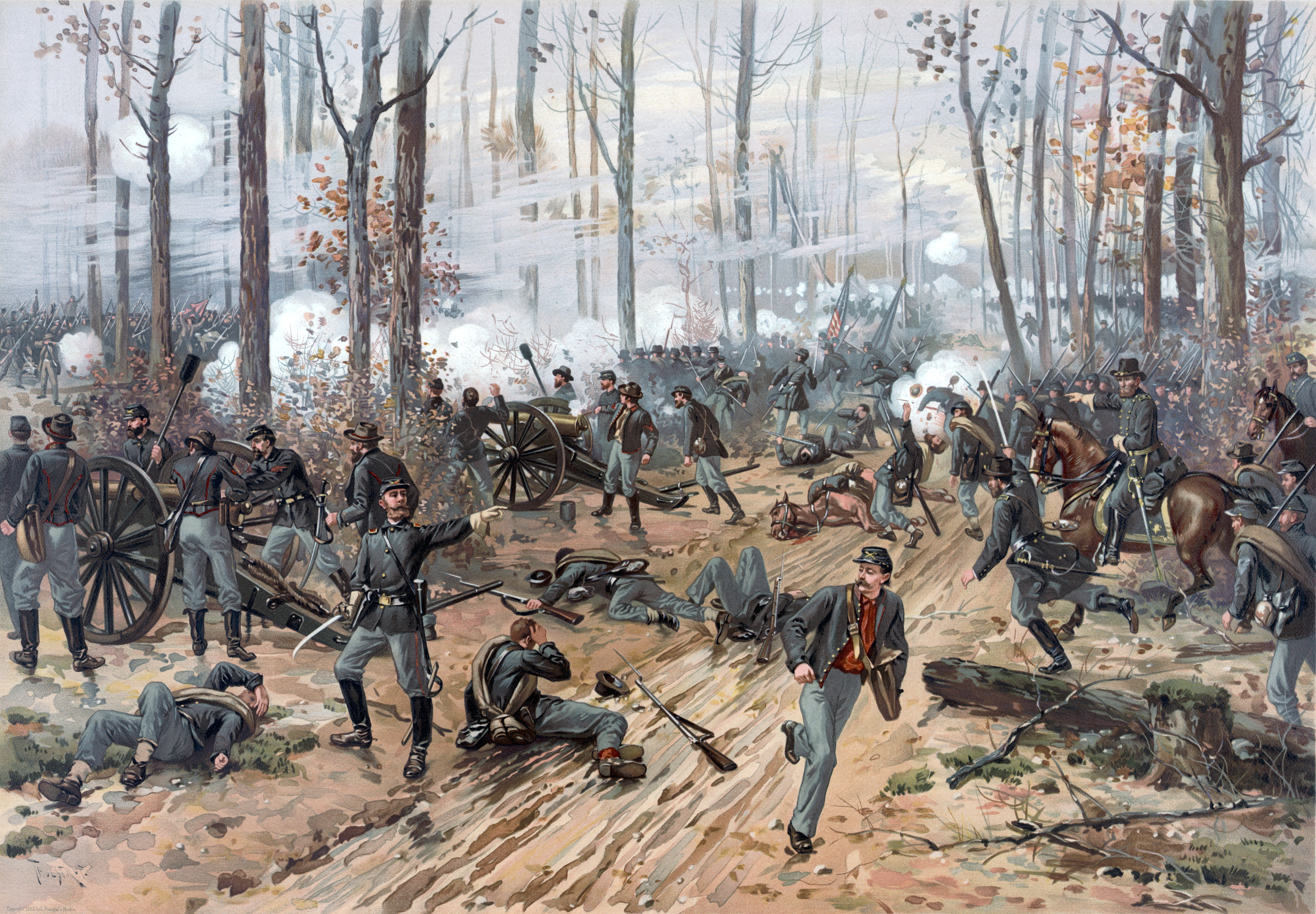
Battle of Shiloh (1888)

After leaving the French Army, Thulstrup moved to Canada in 1872 to become a civil engineer. He moved to the United States in 1873, where he became an artist for the New York Daily Graphic, and, later, Frank Leslie's Illustrated Newspaper, documenting local events. As his skills improved, he became able to move into more and more prestigious roles, including work for Century, Harper's Monthly, and Scribner's Magazine. While living in New York, Thulstrup studied at the Art Students League. His military pictures include a series of paintings depicting the American Civil War, and illustrations of a Virginian lifestyle in the middle of the 18th century.

Thulstrup primarily illustrated historical military scenes, and was praised by one of his publishers, Louis Prang, as "the foremost military artist in America", a sentiment echoed by other contemporary critics. He also illustrated various other subjects.

== Personal life ==
Thulstrup married Lucie Bavoillot in 1879.

== Death ==
He died on June 9, 1930, leaving behind no children, and no personal papers of his have survived. Following his death, his illustrations have been labeled as "some of the most familiar scenes of American life now extant".

== Gallery ==
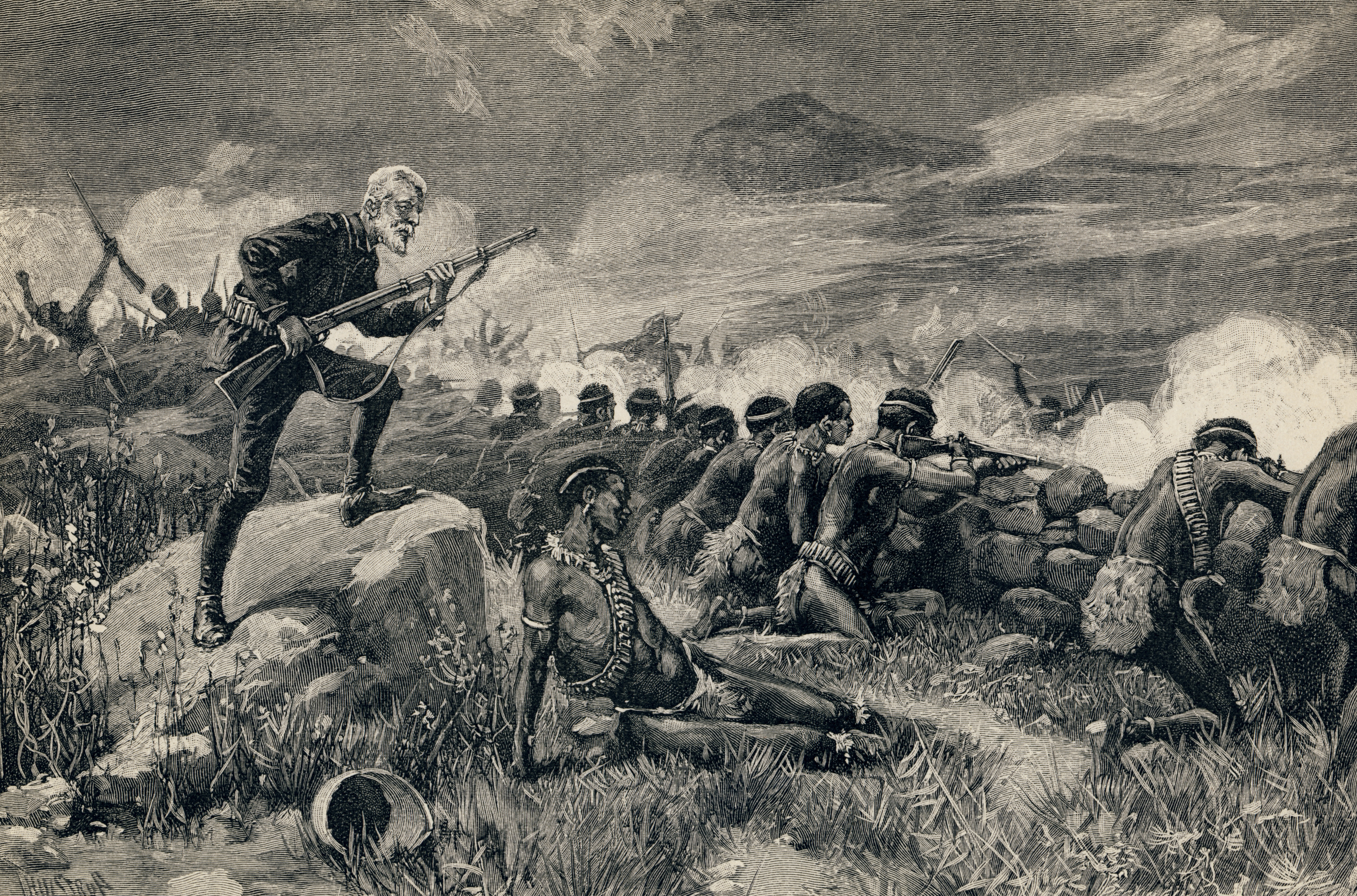
Allan Quatermain orders his men to fire, having waited until the last minute, an 1888 illustration for H. Rider Haggard's Maiwa's Revenge during its serial publication in Harper's Monthly

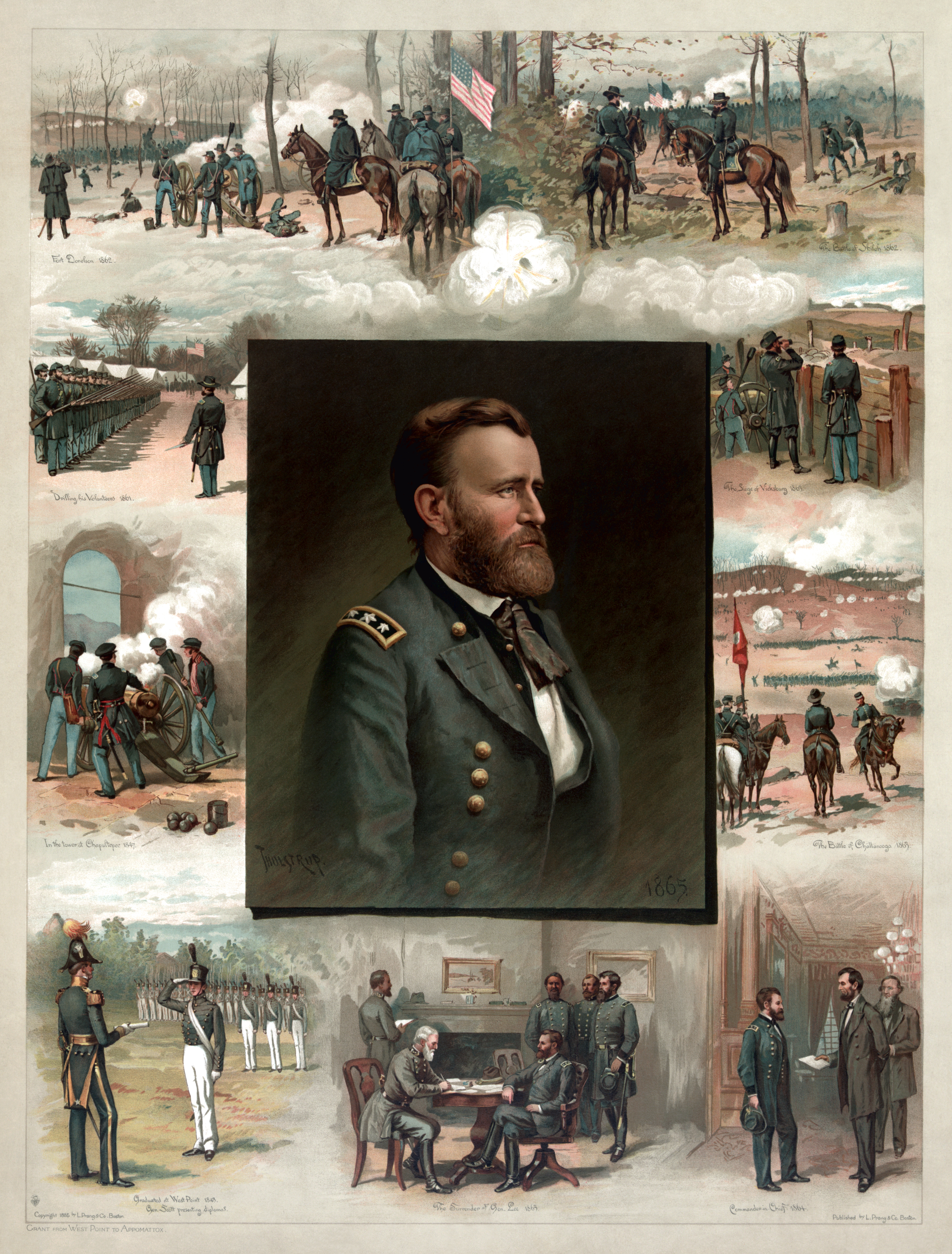
Grant from West Point to Appomattox, an 1885 lithograph by Thulstrup. Clockwise from lower left: Graduation from United States Military Academy at West Point (1843); In the tower at Chapultepec (1847); Drilling his Volunteers (1861); the Battle of Fort Donelson (1862); The Battle of Shiloh (1862); the Siege of Vicksburg (1863); the Chattanooga campaign (1863); Appointment as Commander-in-Chief by Abraham Lincoln (1864); the Surrender of General Robert E. Lee at Appomattox Court House (1865)

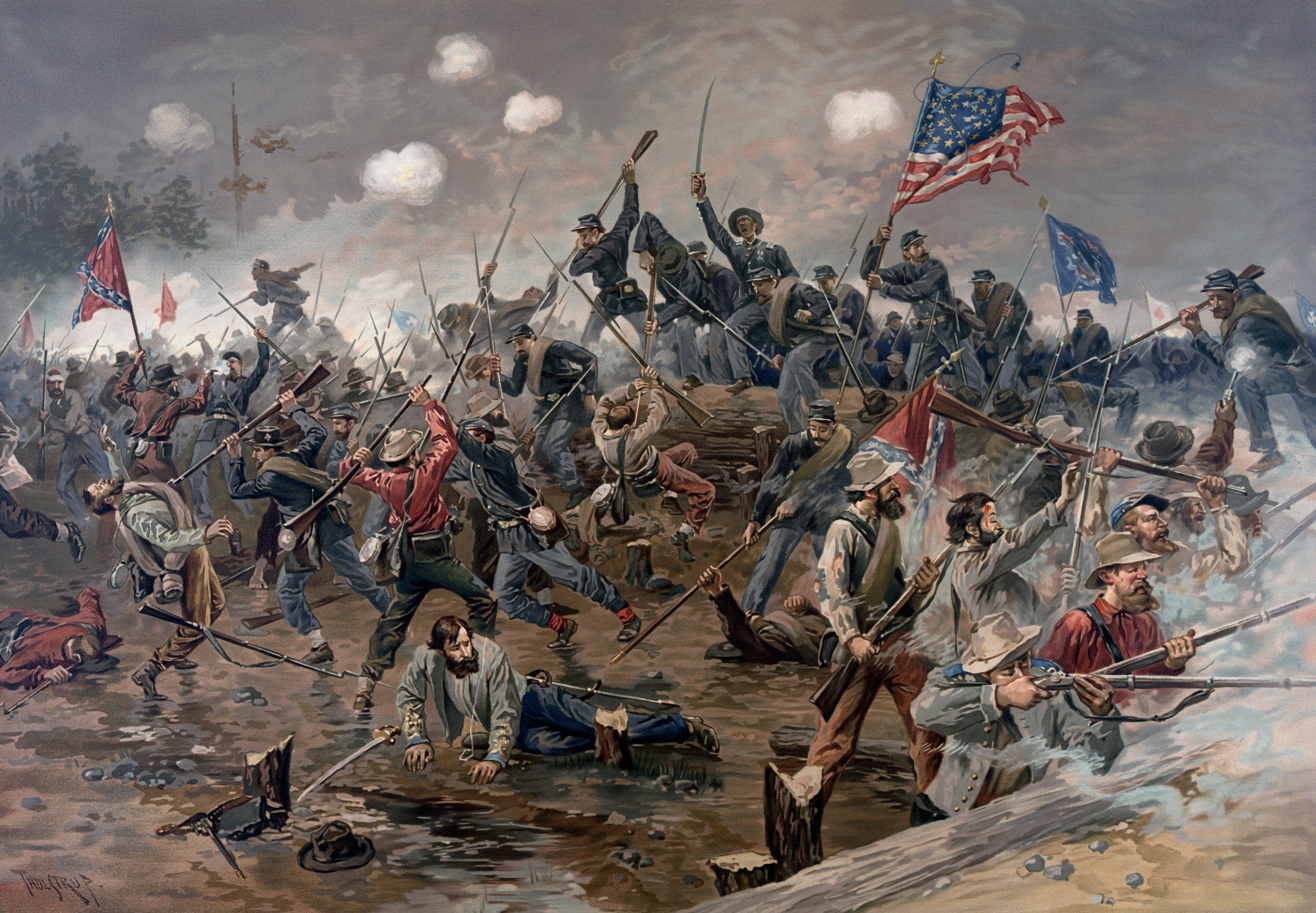
Battle of Spottsylvania (1887)

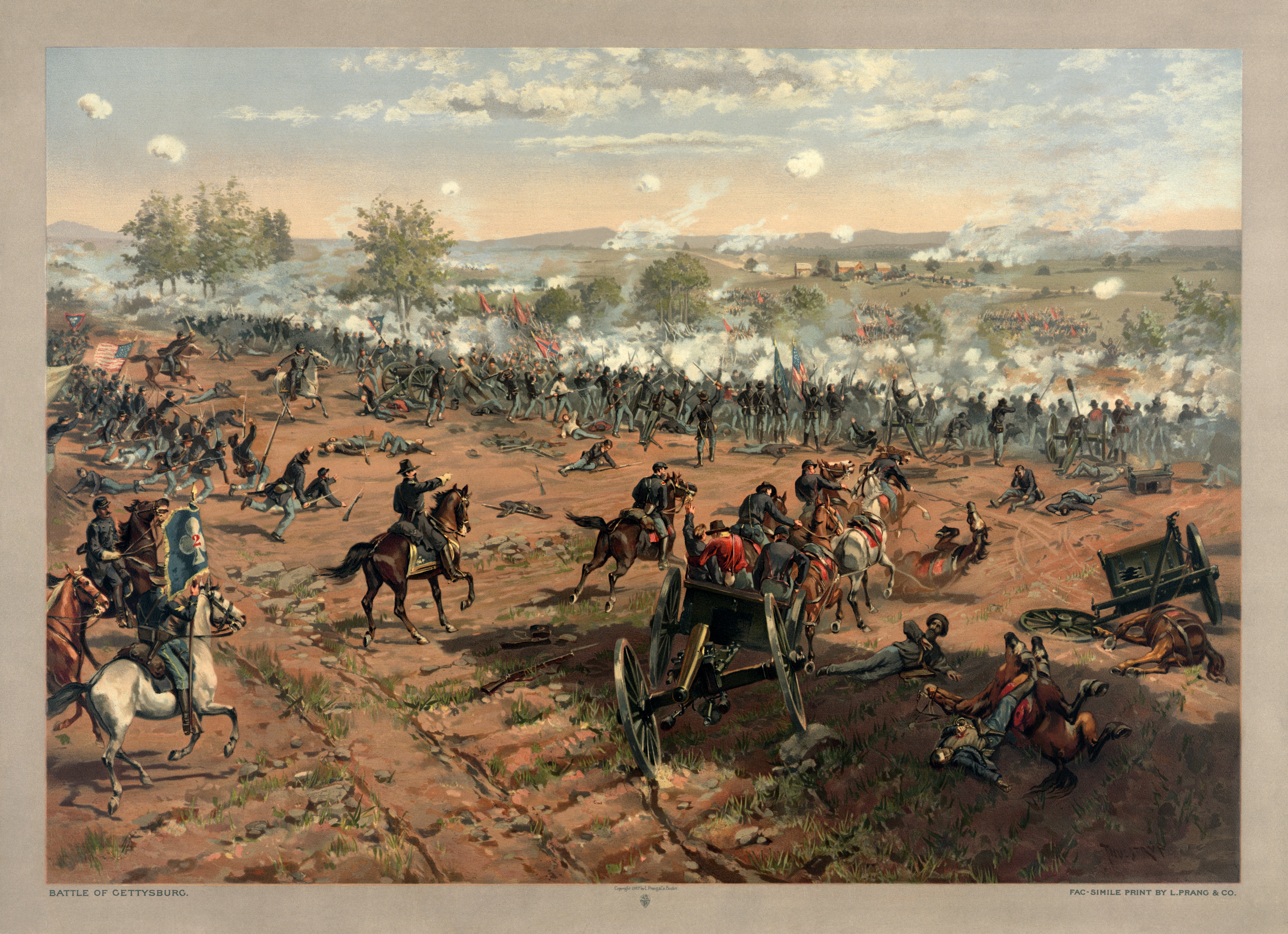
The Battle of Gettysburg, depicting the Battle of Gettysburg, by Thure de Thulstrup
