= 1933 Andorran parliamentary election =

- 31 August 1933

All 23 seats in the General Council
	First party	Second party	Third party
Party	GNI	Socialists	UA
Seats won	14	4	5
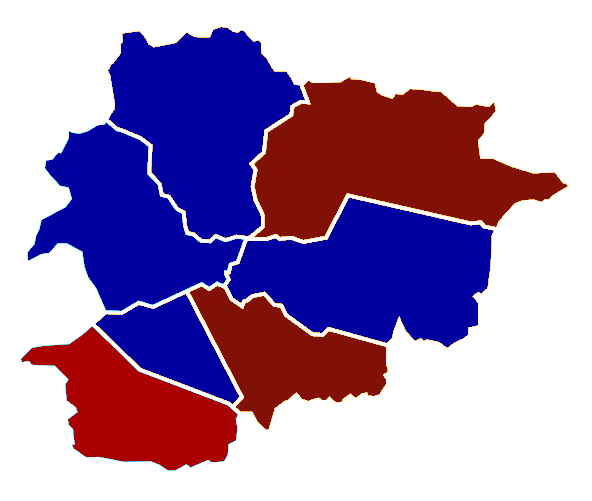
- Popular vote by Parish.

Parliamentary elections were held in Andorra on 31 August 1933, the first held under universal male suffrage. The extension of the franchise to all men over 21 followed social unrest referred to as the Andorran Revolution. As political parties were not legalised until 1993, all candidates ran as independents.

== Background ==
The elections, called by the co-princes, took place amid the occupation of the country by French gendarmes. The police had arrived after the General Council approved universal male suffrage – until then only the heads of household could vote – forced by the occupation of the Casa de la Vall on 5 April by the Young Andorrans. The Tribunal de Corts subsequently dismissed the General Council elected in 1932. Faced with the Council's resistance to dissolution, however, the co-princes sent a contingent of gendarmes to Andorra on 19 August and ordered the elections to be held on 31 August.

== Census ==
Parish	Voters
Canillo	155
Encamp	111
Sant Julia de Loria	121
La Massana	114
Ordino	115
Andorra la Vella	115
Les Escaldes	84
Total	815

== Results ==
The interpretation of the results is complicated because there were no formal political parties, instead councilors were linked to groups that could vary in opinion. The day after the elections, the press reported 14 seats had been won by the Integral Nationalist Group (GNI), conservative supporters of the co-princes; five seats had been won by the Andorran Union (UA), supporters of the deposed General Council, and four had been won by socialists. However, an undated document from the Permanent Delegation French also registered a majority of "anti-episcopal" councilors unfavorable to the co-princes.

=== Elected members ===
The official results were communicated by the Consul General of Canillo to the French veguer.

Parish	Candidate	Group	Votes
Canillo	Josep Areny	UA	11
Canillo	Jaume Bonell	UA	11
Canillo	Anton Duedra	UA	11
Canillo	Anton Torres	UA	11
Encamp	Antoni Picart	GNI	51
Encamp	Antoni Puig	GNI	49
Encamp	Antoni Mussoy	GNI	46
Sant Julia de Loria	Anton Duró	PS	60
Sant Julia de Loria	Ventura Fanus	PS	60
Sant Julia de Loria	Ventura Duró	PS	60
Sant Julia de Loria	Manuel Areny	PS	60
La Massana	Guillem Areny	GNI	34
La Massana	Gil Font	GNI	34
La Massana	Bonaventura Torres	GNI	34
La Massana	Pere Muntaner	GNI	34
Ordino	Bonaventura Adellach	GNI	78
Ordino	Bonaventura Coma	GNI	47
Ordino	Miquel Pujol	GNI	46
Ordino	Manuel Font	GNI	45
Andorra la Vella (Note: The number of votes corresponds to the one published by the press the day after the elections, and not to the official results.)	Josep Coma	GNI	54
Andorra la Vella	Anton Cerquedes	GNI	54
Les Escaldes	Joan Serra	UA	39
Les Escaldes	Josep Pla	GNI	35
