= Heiner Zieschang =

German mathematician

Heiner Zieschang (12 November 1936 in Kiel – 5 April 2004 in Bochum) was a German mathematician. He was a professor at Ruhr University in Bochum from 1968 till 2002. He was a topologist. In 1996 he was an honorary doctor of University of Toulouse and in 1997 he was an honorary professor of Moscow State University.

== Literature ==
- Heiner Zieschang: Flächen und ebene diskontinuierliche Gruppen. Berlin 1970, ISBN 3-540-04911-8 (in German)
- Heiner Zieschang: On decompositions of discontinuous groups of the plane. Math. Zeit. 151 (1976), 165-188
- Heiner Zieschang; Elmar Vogt; Hans-Dieter Coldewey: Surfaces and planar discontinuous groups, Berlin 1980 ISBN 0-387-10024-5
- Heiner Zieschang: Finite groups of mapping classes of surfaces. Berlin 1981, ISBN 3-540-10857-2
- Gerhard Burde; Heiner Zieschang: Knots, Berlin [u.a.] 1985 ISBN 3-11-008675-1; Burde, Gerhard; Zieschang, Heiner (2003). 2nd edition, revised and expanded. Walter de Gruyter. ISBN 978-3-11-017005-4.
- Ralph Stöcker; Heiner Zischang: Algebraische Topologie. Teubner, Stuttgart 1988, ISBN 3-519-02226-5 (in German)
- Heiner Zieschang: Lineare Algebra und Geometrie. Stuttgart 1997, ISBN 3-519-02230-3 (in German)
- Boto v. Querenburg: Mengentheoretische Topologie. 3. Auflage. Springer, Berlin 2001, ISBN 3-540-67790-9 (in German)
