= Ludwig von Sybel =

German archaeologist

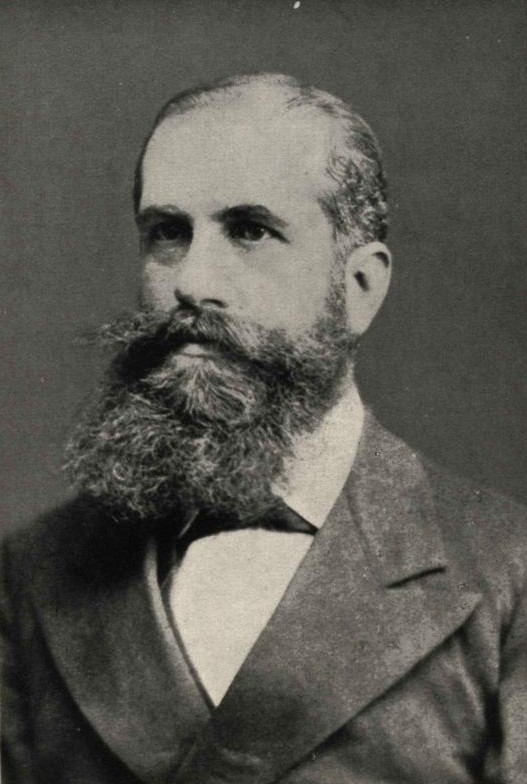
Ludwig von Sybel

Ludwig von Sybel (1 July 1846 – 5 April 1929) was a German archaeologist.

== Life ==
Sybel was born at Marburg, Hesse, as the son of Heinrich von Sybel. He studied at Göttingen and Bonn and became an associate professor of archaeology at the University of Marburg in 1877. In 1888 he attained a full professorship at Marburg, where in 1906, he was named rector.

His scientific travels included trips to Italy (1871–72), Paris and Greece (1879–80) and England (1886).

== Selected works ==
- Ueber Schliemanns Troja (1875)
- Die Mythologie der Ilias (1877)
- Katalog der Skulpturen zu Athen (1881)
- Kritik des ägyptischen Ornaments (1883)
- Weltgeschichte der Kunst im Altertum (second edition, 1903)
- Christliche Antike (I. Einleitendes, Katakomben, 1906; II. Skulptur, Architectur, 1909)
