= List of University of Bonn people =

This is a list of University of Bonn people including people who have taught or studied at the University of Bonn

== Nobel laureates ==
- Reinhard Genzel – 2020 Nobel Prize in Physics
  - "for the discovery of a supermassive compact object at the centre of our galaxy"
- Harald zur Hausen – 2008 Nobel Prize in Physiology or Medicine
  - "for his discovery of human papilloma viruses causing cervical cancer"
- Reinhard Selten – 1994 Nobel Prize in Economics
  - "for their pioneering analysis of equilibria in the theory of non-cooperative games"
- Wolfgang Paul – 1989 Nobel Prize in Physics
  - "for the development of the ion trap technique"
- Luigi Pirandello – 1934 Nobel Prize in Literature
  - "for his bold and ingenious revival of dramatic and scenic art"
- Otto Wallach – 1910 Nobel Prize in Chemistry
  - "in recognition of his services to organic chemistry and the chemical industry by his pioneer work in the field of alicyclic compounds"
- Paul Johann Ludwig von Heyse – 1910 Nobel Prize in Literature
  - "as a tribute to the consummate artistry, permeated with idealism, which he has demonstrated during his long productive career as a lyric poet, dramatist, novelist and writer of world-renowned short stories"
- Philipp Lenard – 1905 Nobel Prize in Physics
  - "for his work on cathode rays"

== Fields Medalists ==
- Maryna Viazovska – 2022 Fields Medal
  - "for the proof that the E8 lattice provides the densest packing of identical spheres in 8 dimensions, and further contributions to related extremal problems and interpolation problems in Fourier analysis"
- Peter Scholze – 2018 Fields Medal
  - "for transforming arithmetic algebraic geometry over p-adic fields through his introduction of perfectoid spaces, with application to Galois representations, and for the development of new cohomology theories"
- Maxim Kontsevich – 1998 Fields Medal
  - "for his contributions to four problems of Geometry"
- Gerd Faltings – 1986 Fields Medal
  - "for his proof of the Mordell Conjecture"

== Faculty ==
- Friedrich Wilhelm August Argelander (1799–1875), Astronomy
- Ernst Moritz Arndt (1769–1860), History
- Karl Barth (1886–1968), Theology
- Bruno Bauer (1809–1882) Theology
- Carl Heinrich Becker (1876–1933), Oriental Philology
- Karl Dietrich Bracher (born 1922), Political Science
- Franz Bücheler (1837–1908), Classics
- Friedrich Calker (1790–1870), Philosophy
- Constantin Carathéodory, (1873–1850) Mathematics
- Rudolf Julius Emanuel Clausius (1822–1888), Physics
- Ernst Robert Curtius (1886–1956), Romance Literature
- Friedrich Christian Diez (1794–1876), Philology
- Christian Drosten (born 1972), Head of the Charité Institute of Virology, Virology
- Benno Erdmann (1898–1909), Philosophy
- Udo di Fabio (born 1954), member of the Federal Constitutional Court of Germany since 1999, Law
- Gerd Faltings (born 1954), Mathematics
- Alexander Filippou (born 1958), Professor of Inorganic Chemistry
- Heinrich Geißler (1814–1879), Physics
- Klaus Günther (born 1957), Honorary Professor of Analytical Chemistry
- Felix Hausdorff (1868–1942), Mathematics
- Hermann von Helmholtz (1821–1894), Medicine and Physics
- Georg Hermes (1775–1831), Theology
- Heinrich Hertz (1857–1894), Physics
- Werner Hildenbrand (born 1936), Economics
- Friedrich Hirzebruch (born 1927), Mathematics
- Manfred Hutter (born 1957), Religious studies
- Marek Karpinski (born 1948), Computer Science, Mathematics
- Gottfried Kinkel (1815–1882), History
- Wilhelm Krelle (1916–2004), Economics
- Walther Kruse (1864–1943), Bacteriology
- Christian Lassen (1800–1876), Oriental Philology
- Maria von Linden, (1869–1936), first female Professor
- Rudolf Lipschitz, (1832–1903), Mathematics
- Karl Martin Menten, (1957–2024) Radio astronomy
- Werner Meyer-Eppler (1913–1960), Phonetics
- Barthold Georg Niebuhr, (1776–1831) History
- Martin Noth (1902–1968), Theology
- Felix Otto (born 1966), Mathematics
- Wolfgang Paul (1913–1993), Physics
- Carl Adam Petri (born 1926), Mathematics
- Wilhelm Pfeffer (1845–1920), Botany
- Eduard Friedrich Wilhelm Pflüger (1829–1910), Physiology
- Alfred Philippson (1864–1953), Geology and Geography
- Julius Plücker (1801–1868), Mathematics and Physics
- Joseph Ratzinger (born 1927), Pope, Theology
- Ferdinand von Richthofen (1833–1905), Geology
- Friedrich Wilhelm Ritschl (1806–1876), Classics
- Walter Schellenberg (born 1929), Law
- Rudolf Schieffer (1947–2018), Medieval history
- Annemarie Schimmel (1922–2003), Oriental Philology
- August Wilhelm Schlegel (1767–1845), Philosophy
- Bernhard Schlink (born 1944), Law
- Johannes Schmidt (1843–1901), Linguistics
- Carl Schmitt (1888–1985), Law
- Arnold Schönhage (born 1934), Mathematics
- Joseph Schumpeter (1883–1950), Economics
- Reinhard Selten (born 1930), Economics
- Karl Simrock (1802–1872), German Studies
- Heinrich Freiherr von Stackelberg (1905–1946), Economics
- Ethelbert Stauffer (1902–1979), Theology
- Friedrich August Kekulé von Stradonitz (1829–1896), Chemistry
- Eduard Strasburger (1844–1912), Botany
- Heinrich von Sybel (1817–1895), History
- Otto Toeplitz (1881–1940), Mathematics
- Carl Troll (1899–1975), Geography
- Hermann Karl Usener (1834–1905), Classics
- Otto Wallach (1847–1931), Chemistry
- Axel A. Weber (born 1957), President of the Deutsche Bundesbank since 2004, Economics
- Walter Weizel (1901–1982), Physics
- Ernst August Weiß (1900–1942), Mathematics

== Alumni ==
=== A ===
- Heinrich Friedrich Otto Abel
- Sigurd Abel
- Charles McLaren, 1st Baron Aberconway
- Marylyn Addo
- Konrad Adenauer
- Hans-Henning Adler
- Samuel Adler (rabbi)
- Mary Agria
- Irene Zoe Alameda
- Wolfgang Albers (police president)
- Albert of Saxony
- Barbara Albert (chemist)
- Karl Albert
- Albert, Prince Consort
- Alexis, Prince of Bentheim and Steinfurt
- Syed Mujtaba Ali
- Julius Althaus
- Margaret Altmann
- Johann Baptist Alzog
- Juozas Ambrazevičius
- Katajun Amirpur
- Andreas Reckwitz
- Hugo Andresen
- Ernst Anrich
- Richard Anschütz
- John Antoniadis
- Hans-Jürgen Appelrath
- Jürgen Aschoff
- Ludwig Aschoff
- Jörg Asmussen
- Erna Auerbach

=== B ===
- Johannes Theodor Baargeld
- Emil Baehrens
- Hans Werner Ballmann
- Johann Baptista Baltzer
- Christian Bär
- Otto Bardenhewer
- Norbert Bartel
- Sandra Bartky
- Bartłomiej Wróblewski
- Tung Pao-cheng
- Wolf Bauer
- Bettina Baumgärtel
- Theodor Baums
- Canan Bayram
- Hermann Heinrich Becker
- Max Joseph Becker
- Carl Traugott Beilschmied
- Anna Benaki-Psarouda
- Hans Bender
- Otto Benndorf
- Max Bense
- Friedrich von Berg
- Alexander Berghaus
- Anton Berlage
- Jakob Bernays
- Michael Bernays
- Carlos Bertulani
- Erich Bethe
- Peter Beyer (politician)
- Willibald Beyschlag
- Ernst Bickel
- Margarete Bieber
- Marianne Bielschowsky
- August Daniel von Binzer
- Karl Hermann Bitter
- Matthew Black
- Friedrich Blass
- Orrin Dubbs Bleakley
- Wilhelm Bleek
- Gisela Bleibtreu-Ehrenberg
- Raimund Bleischwitz
- Immanuel Bloch
- Joachim Blüher
- Norbert Blüm
- Clemens Blume
- Johann Jakob Blumer
- Franz Boas
- Eduard Böcking
- Wilhelm Boden
- Friedrich Simon Bodenheimer
- Henning von Boehmer
- Alberto Boerger
- Albrecht von Boeselager
- Peter van Bohlen
- Emil du Bois-Reymond
- Wilhelm Bölsche
- Heinrich Bone
- Alfred Maximilien Bonnet
- Beatrix Borchard
- Eugen Bormann
- Gustav Jacob Born
- Axel Börsch-Supan
- Karl Borsch
- Hermann Bottenbruch
- Michael Brand (politician)
- Helmut Brandt
- Alexis Brasseur
- August Brauer
- Hermann Breymann
- Götz Briefs
- Egbert Brieskorn
- Klaus Brockhoff
- Caspar Max Brosius
- Heike Brötz-Oesterhelt
- Hermann Brück
- Heinrich Brüning
- Markus Brunnermeier
- Claudia Maria Buch
- Karl Bücher
- Edith Bülbring
- Jacob Burckhardt
- Volker Burkert
- Wolfram Burgard
- Karl Butzer

=== C ===
- Otto von Camphausen
- Petre P. Carp
- Winifred Cavenagh
- Victor Cherbuliez
- Prince Christian of Schleswig-Holstein
- Kypros Chrysostomides
- Somyot Chueathai
- Rainer Ludwig Claisen
- Campbell Clarke
- Johannes Classen
- Carl Clemen
- Franz Jakob Clemens
- Charles P. Clever
- Michael Clyne
- Pierre Colas
- Jörg Colberg
- Alexander Eugen Conrady
- Julian Coolidge
- Corps Borussia Bonn
- Pascal Costanza
- John Adam Cramb
- Ronald Crutcher
- Otto Cuntz

=== D ===
- Hermann von Dechend
- Otto Deiters
- Hans Delbrück
- Eva Demmerle
- Alastair Denniston
- Carrie Derick
- Bärbel Dieckmann
- Hermann Alexander Diels
- Paul Diepgen
- Harold Dillon, 17th Viscount Dillon
- Karl Dilthey
- Peter Gustav Lejeune Dirichlet
- Alexander zu Dohna-Schlobitten (1899–1997)
- Anton Dohrn
- Hilde Domin
- Hans Adam Dorten
- Markus Dröge
- Erich von Drygalski
- Konrad Duden
- Friedrich von Duhn
- Ernst Dümmler
- Maximilian Wolfgang Duncker
- Johann Heinrich Joseph Düntzer
- Khalid Duran
- William West Durant
- Nikolai Durov
- Aramesh Dustdar
- Karl Franz Otto Dziatzko

=== E ===
- Hermann Ebbinghaus
- Martin Eberts
- Hendrik Elias
- Alexander Ellinger
- Robert Elsie
- Anton Elter
- Tom Enders
- Adolph Albrecht Erlenmeyer
- Ernst August Weiß
- Max Ernst
- Jan Esper
- Walter Eucken
- Botho zu Eulenburg
- August Everding

=== F ===
- Anton Fahne
- Heino Falcke
- Constantin Fasolt
- Markus Feldenkirchen
- Wilfried Feldenkirchen
- Michael F. Feldkamp
- Julius von Ficker
- Frank Findeiß
- Wolfgang Finkelnburg
- Bernhard Fischer-Wasels
- Anton Hubert Fischer
- Emil Fischer
- Karsten Fischer (political scientist)
- Theobald Fischer
- William Roby Fletcher
- Tina van de Flierdt
- Florika Fink-Hooijer
- Dieter Fox
- Wolfgang Bernhard Fränkel
- Fritz Frech
- Frederick Francis II, Grand Duke of Mecklenburg-Schwerin
- Frederick III, German Emperor
- Wilhelm von Freeden
- Josef Frenken
- Solomon Frensdorff
- Carl Remigius Fresenius
- Angela D. Friederici
- Julius Friedländer (numismatist)
- Prince Friedrich Karl of Prussia (1828–1885)
- Johann Carl Fuhlrott

=== G ===
- Nina Gantert
- Harald Garcke
- Wilhelm von Gayl
- Emanuel Geibel
- Abraham Geiger
- Lazarus Geiger
- Reinhard Genzel
- Alfred Gercke
- Erich Gerhards
- Pradyut Ghosh
- Johann Gildemeister
- Basil Lanneau Gildersleeve
- Cemile Giousouf
- Frank Glaw
- John J. Glennon
- Hans Globke
- Joseph Goebbels
- Hans Rupprecht Goette
- Leah Goldberg
- Levin Goldschmidt
- Theodor Goldstücker
- Helmut Gollwitzer
- Heinrich Ernst Göring
- Guido Görres
- Hermann Heinrich Gossen
- Alfred Gottschalk (biochemist)
- Lothar Göttsche
- Ernst Götzinger
- Willi Graf
- Heinrich Wilhelm Grauert
- Henry Green (MP for Poplar)
- Theodore F. Green
- Karl Gottlieb Grell
- Hans von der Groeben
- Detlef Gromoll
- Bernhard Gröschel
- Klaus Groth
- Martin Grötschel
- Nikolai Grube
- Heinrich Grüber
- Monika Grütters
- Herlind Gundelach

=== H ===
- Harald Haarmann
- Michaela Haas
- Julius von Haast
- Jürgen Habermas
- Birke Häcker
- Johann Georg Hagen
- Jürgen von Hagen
- Heinz Halm
- Ursula Hamenstädt
- Muhammad Hamidullah
- Han Young-sil
- Joseph Hansen (historian)
- Michael E. Hansen
- Albert Harkness
- Robert Almer Harper
- Eva Harth
- Robert Hartmeyer
- Martin Haug
- Prosper de Haulleville
- Harald zur Hausen
- Bodo Hauser
- Martina Havenith-Newen
- D. E. L. Haynes
- Matthias Heider
- Heinrich Heine
- Karl Heinzen
- Eduard Heis
- Wolfgang Helbig
- Ernst Wilhelm Hengstenberg
- Friedrich Gustav Jakob Henle
- Kurt Hensel
- Ferdinand Ludwig Herff
- Ferdinand A. Hermens
- Richard Hertwig
- Laura Herz
- Gerd Heusch
- Friedrich Heusler
- Ludwig Heusner
- Ahmad Ali Heydari
- Paul Heyse
- Raymond Hickey
- Bernhard Josef Hilgers
- Hilmar Duerbeck
- George Him
- Samson Raphael Hirsch
- Samuel Hirsch
- Winifred Hoernlé
- Jacobus Henricus van 't Hoff
- August Heinrich Hoffmann von Fallersleben
- Hubertus Hoffmann
- Dean Hoge
- Alfred Holder
- Joachim Wilhelm Franz Philipp von Holtzendorff
- Karl Holzamer
- Axel Honneth
- Karl Hopf
- Ernst Höpfner
- Josef Hopmann
- How to Dress Well
- Emil Hübner
- Hermann Hüffer
- William Wilson Hunter
- Rene Hurlemann

=== I ===
- Mario Germán Iguarán Arana
- Johannes Ilberg
- Wolfgang Ischinger
- Caspar Isenkrahe
- Otto Ites

=== J ===
- Abraham Jacobi
- Paul Jacobsthal
- Gottlieb von Jagow
- Sheik-Umarr Mikailu Jah
- Gottlieb Heinrich Georg Jahr
- Johannes Janssen
- Jens Carsten Jantzen
- Sheila Jasanoff
- Anton Saurma von der Jeltsch
- Ronald Jensen
- Wilhelm Joest
- John Hennig
- Henri Jordan
- Jürgen Jost
- Kurt Josten
- Ju Gau-jeng
- James Robertson Justice

=== K ===
- Bruno Kahl
- Paul E. Kahle
- Kamyar Kalantar-Zadeh
- August Kalkmann
- Karekin II
- Georg Karo
- Gustav Karsten
- Hermann Karsten (physicist)
- Alexander Kaufmann
- Eduard Kaufmann
- Ralph Kaufmann
- Franz Philip Kaulen
- Ulrich Kelber
- Otto Keller (philologist)
- Klaus Kern
- İhsan Ketin
- John Killick
- Klaus Kinkel
- Alfred Kirchhoff
- Kittisak Prokati
- Felix Klein
- Volkmar Klein
- Onno Klopp
- Adolf Klügmann
- Hans Knappertsbusch
- Karl-Rudolf Koch
- Wolfgang Köhler
- Otto Kohlrausch
- Albert von Kölliker
- Maxim Kontsevich
- Bärbel Koribalski
- Dieter Kotschick
- Otto Kranzbühler
- Matthias Kreck
- Josef Kreiner
- Heinrich Kreutz
- August David Krohn
- Ernst Kromayer
- Hermann Krukenberg
- Heinrich Kruse
- Felix Kübler
- Heinz Kunert
- Aenne Kurowski-Schmitz
- Annette Kurschus
- Johann Heinrich Kurtz
- Ernst Georg Ferdinand Küster

=== L ===
- Alexander Graf Lambsdorff
- Otto Graf Lambsdorff
- George Martin Lane
- Johann Peter Lange
- Joseph Langen
- Richard Laqueur
- Ernst von Lasaulx
- Armin Laschet
- Christian Lassen
- Barbour Lathrop
- Thomas Laubach
- Georg von Laubmann
- Sabine Lautenschläger
- Kartar Lalvani
- Philip Le Couteur
- Lee Yuan-tsu
- Olaf Lechtenfeld
- Max Lehmann
- Robert Lehr
- Ursula Lehr
- Paul Lejeune-Jung
- Max Lenz
- William Ellery Leonard
- Gerd Leonhard
- Oliver Lepsius
- Harald Lesch
- Erich Leschke
- Paul Leser
- Robert Ley
- Justus von Liebig
- Peter Liese
- Justin von Linde
- Daniel Lindemann
- Christian Lindner
- Christiane Löhr
- Hanns Christian Löhr
- Detlef Lohse
- Paul Lorenzen
- Joseph Lortz
- August Lösch
- Otto Lowenstein
- Wilhelm Lübke
- Robert Bulwer-Lytton, 1st Earl of Lytton

=== M ===
- Hans-Georg Maaßen
- Ulrike Malmendier
- Bernhard Mann
- Thilo Marauhn
- Paul Marquard
- Karl Marx
- Wilhelm Marx
- Angus Matheson
- Friedrich Matz
- Axel Maußen
- Alexandru Mavrodi
- Hans Mayer
- Hans Meerwein
- Mehmet Celal Bey
- Johann Wilhelm Meigen
- Friedrich Meinecke
- Anton Menge
- Heinrich Theodor Menke
- Wolfgang Menzel
- Joseph von Mering
- Friedrich Merz
- John Theodore Merz
- Ioan Meșotă
- Ernst Messerschmid
- Werner Meyer-Eppler
- Andreas Meyer-Lindenberg
- Alfred Meyer
- Eduard Meyer
- Hugo Miehe
- Antonio Milošoski
- Julius von Mirbach
- Jürgen Mittelstraß
- Otto Gottlieb Mohnike
- Paul Moldenhauer
- Freya von Moltke
- Albert Mooren
- John Daniel Morell
- Christoph Moufang
- Hans Müller (politician)
- John Muir (indologist)
- Johannes Peter Müller
- Nicole Müller (linguist)
- Peter Müller (politician)
- Hermann Mutschmann

=== N ===
- Andrea Nahles
- Jürgen Neukirch
- Stephen Ng
- James Nicol
- William H. Nienhauser, Jr.
- Benedikt Niese
- Barbara Niethammer
- Friedrich Nietzsche
- Georg Nöldeke
- Carl von Noorden
- Eduard Norden

=== O ===
- Axel Ockenfels
- George Ogilvie-Forbes
- Sjur Olsnes
- Hermann Oppenheim
- Gustav Solomon Oppert
- Johannes Orth
- Felix Otto (mathematician)
- Johannes Overbeck
- Adolf Overweg

=== P ===
- Hermann Pabst
- Spiridon Palauzov
- Herbert Edward Palmer
- Raimon Panikkar
- Ludwig von Pastor
- Christian Patermann
- Friedrich Paulsen
- Hermann Pauly
- Heinz-Otto Peitgen
- Grigol Peradze
- Erich Pernice
- Georg Perthes
- Tilman Pesch
- Norbert Peters (priest)
- Eugen Petersen
- Friedbert Pflüger
- Friedrich Philippi (historian)
- Alfred Philippson
- Claus Pias
- Monika Piazzesi
- Amé Pictet
- Luigi Pirandello
- Frederik Pleitgen
- Hans-Gert Pöttering
- William Thierry Preyer
- George Prothero
- Eugen Prym

=== Q ===
- Nicolae Quintescu

=== R ===
- Julius Eckhardt Raht
- Uta Ranke-Heinemann
- Rolf Rannacher
- Gerhard vom Rath
- Augustus Rauschenbusch
- Udo Recker
- Friedrich Daniel von Recklinghausen
- Henry Regnery
- Anton Reicha
- August Reichensperger
- August Reifferscheid
- Joseph Hubert Reinkens
- Adolf Remelé
- Alfred von Reumont
- Franz Heinrich Reusch
- Otto Ribbeck
- Franz Richarz
- Eugen Richter
- Hans Riegel
- Charles Pierre Henri Rieu
- Matthias Ring
- Gerhard Ringel
- Albrecht Ritschl
- Otto Ritschl
- Franz Ritter
- Emil Ritterling
- Robert Kurt Woetzel
- Erwin Rohde
- Hermann von Rohden
- Gustaf Otto Rosenberg
- Norbert Röttgen
- Gerhard Charles Rump

=== S ===
- Jörg-Rüdiger Sack
- Karl Ludwig Fridolin von Sandberger
- Raymond Sandover
- Thilo Sarrazin
- Lisa Sauermann
- Rudolf Scharping
- Nina Scheer
- Walter Schellenberg
- Alexander Jacob Schem
- Rudolf Schieffer
- Jakob Schipper
- August Schleicher
- Sigismund von Schlichting
- Johannes Schmidt (linguist)
- Klaus M. Schmidt
- Viktor Schmieden
- Franz August Schmölders
- Erhard Scholz
- Peter Scholze
- Gustav von Schönberg
- Ludwig Schopen
- Julius Schubring
- Adolf Schulten
- Hugo Paul Friedrich Schulz
- Franz Eilhard Schulze
- Hagen Schulze
- E. F. Schumacher
- Robert Schuman
- Carl Schurz
- Carl August Wilhelm Schwacke
- Irmgard Schwaetzer
- Gustav Schwalbe
- Joseph Schwane
- Theodor Schwann
- Karl Schwarz
- Hans Schwerdtfeger
- Joachim Schwermer
- George Douglas-Hamilton, 10th Earl of Selkirk
- William Seton
- Jürgen Seydel
- Marwan al-Shehhi
- Bernd Siebert
- Carl Siegfried
- Hermann Simon (manager)
- Karl Joseph Simrock
- Eduard von Simson
- Robert Skeris
- Ronald Smelser
- Richard Smyth (minister)
- Theodor Sparkuhl
- Friedrich von Spiegel
- Friedrich Spielhagen
- Jan Michael Sprenger
- Friedrich Staub
- Michael Stausberg
- Angelika Steger
- Wolfgang Steglich
- Roderich Stintzing
- Karlheinz Stockhausen
- Karl-Otto Stöhr
- Monika Stolz
- Eduard Strasburger
- Julius Strasburger
- Hendrik Streeck
- Adolf Strodtmann
- Siegfried Sudhaus
- Uwe Sunde
- Heinrich von Sybel
- Ludwig von Sybel

=== T ===
- Atif Tauqeer
- Sabriye Tenberken
- Michael Theobald
- Insa Thiele-Eich
- Hugo Thielen
- Günther Thomann
- Sebastian Thrun
- Hans Tietmeyer
- Adolf Tobler
- Jan Peter Toennies
- Ferdinand Tönnies
- Peter E. Toschek
- James W. Treffinger
- Heinrich von Treitschke
- Heinrich Trettner

=== U ===
- Horst Ueberhorst
- Gustav Uhlig
- Jacob Utsch

=== V ===
- Johannes Vahlen
- Rüdiger Valk
- Willi Veller
- Günter Verheugen
- Friedrich Heinrich Vering
- Maryna Viazovska
- Eva Viehmann
- Franz Volhard
- Friedrich Vollmer
- Andreas von Antropoff

=== W ===
- Curt Wachsmuth
- Hermann Friedrich Waesemann
- Henry Wakefield (bishop of Birmingham)
- Norbert Walter-Borjans
- George Washington (inventor)
- Wilhelm Wattenbach
- Alfred Weber
- Batty Weber
- Karl Otto Weber
- Max Carl Wilhelm Weber
- Otto Weber (theologian)
- Franz Gerhard Wegeler
- Hans-Ulrich Wehler
- Werner Weidenfeld
- Jens Weidmann
- Karl Weierstrass
- Andreas Weigend
- Robert Weimar
- Jakob von Weizsäcker
- Robert K. von Weizsäcker
- Benedict Welte
- Katrin Wendland
- Guido Westerwelle
- Robert Whytlaw-Gray
- Hermann Wichelhaus
- Max Ernst Wichura
- Ulrich Wickert
- Anna Wienhard
- Leo Wiese
- Ulrich von Wilamowitz-Moellendorff
- Wilhelm II, German Emperor
- Prince Wilhelm of Prussia (1906–1940)
- Léonard Willems
- August Wilmanns
- Max Wilms
- Lewis Strange Wingfield
- Hermann Winnefeld
- Robert Wintgen
- Karl Wirtz
- Rotraut Wisskirchen
- Peter Wittig
- Friedrich Wolf (writer)
- Guntram Wolff
- Albrecht Wolters
- Adolf Wüllner

=== Y ===
- Christos Yannaras

=== Z ===
- Karl Zangemeister
- Angela Zigahl
- Ferdinand Zirkel
- Ernst Zitelmann
- Wolf W. Zuelzer
- Nathan Zuntz
