= Calker =

Calker is a surname. Notable people with the name include:

- Arnold van Calker (born 1976), Dutch bobsledder
- Barend Christiaan van Calker (1738–1813), Dutch medallist
- Darrell Calker (1905–1964), American composer and arranger
- Edwin van Calker (born 1979), Dutch bobsledder
- Friedrich Calker (1790–1870), German philosopher
