= Leschke =

Leschke is a German surname. Notable people with this name include:

- Erich Leschke (1887–1933), German physician
- Hajo Leschke (born 1945), German mathematical physicist
- Janine Leschke, editor of academic journal Journal of European Social Policy
- John Leschke, 1990 winner of the Shingo Prize
- Katrin Leschke (born 1968), German mathematician

== See also ==
- Leschke syndrome, a medical condition named after Erich Leschke
