= Thomann =

Thomann may refer to:

- Thomann (retailer), a German on-line retailer of musical instruments, especially its own Harley Benton brand

== People ==
- Georg Paul Thomann (1945–2005), fictitious Austrian artist
- Peter Thomann (born 1940), German photographer
- Jacob Ernst Thomann von Hagelstein (c. 1588 - 1653), German baroque painter
- Günther Thomann (1957), German author, minister

== See also ==
- Thoman (disambiguation)
