= Max Becker =

Max Becker may refer to:

- Max Becker (politician) (1888–1960), German politician
- Max Becker, member of American punk rock band SWMRS
- Max Joseph Becker (1828–1896), German-born American civil engineer
