= Patermann =

Patermann is a surname. Notable people with the surname include:

- Christian Patermann (born 1942), German lawyer
- Georg Patermann (1580–1628), German composer
