= Breymann =

Breymann is a surname.

Notable people with this surname include:

- Adolf Breymann (1839–1878), German sculptor
- Heinrich von Breymann (died 1777), German soldier
- Henriette Schrader-Breymann (1827–1899), German educator
- Hermann Breymann (1842–1910), German philologist
- Susanne Rode-Breymann (born 1958), German musicologist
