= Berlage (disambiguation) =

Hendrik Petrus Berlage was a Dutch architect.

Berlage may also refer to:

- Berlage Institute, Rotterdam
- Berlage (crater), a crater on the Moon
- Beurs van Berlage, a building in Amsterdam designed by H. P. Berlage

== Other people with the surname ==
- Anton Berlage, a German theologian
