= Miehe =

Miehe is a surname. Notable people with the surname include:

- Hugo Miehe (1875–1932), German botanist
- Ulf Miehe (1940–1989), German screenwriter
