= Sefer Oklah we-Oklah =

The sefer Oklah we-Oklah (אָכְלָה וְאָכְלָה) is an old Masoretic work in which the notices and rules of the Masorah are collected; it consists of groups of rare words or of certain peculiarities of the text arranged either alphabetically, or in the order of the books of the Bible, or according to some other principle, and contains also brief rules and notes on various phenomena found in the original text of the Bible. This work, whose author is unknown, takes its title from the first two words of the opening passage, which is an alphabetical list of words occurring only twice in the Bible, in one passage without the prefixed waw and in the other with it, the first of these pairs of words being oklah (אָכְלָה ) from 1 Samuel 1:9 and we-oklah ( וְאָכְלָה ) from Genesis 27:19.

The book is first mentioned by Jonah ibn Janah, not only in his lexicon, but even in his first work. Ibn Janah there calls it Masoret Oklah we-Oklah, and designates it as the most correct book on the Masorah. It is quoted, however, as early as the tenth century by the Karaite lexicographer David ben Abraham al-Fasi under the (Arabic) title of The Great Masorah, and it is referred to as the Masoret ha-Gedolah by Rashi and his grandson Rabbi Jacob Tam. It is clear, furthermore, from references in manuscripts that Rabbi Gershom ben Judah, the "Light of the Exile" (d. 1040), made a copy of this "great Masorah" (i.e., the Sefer Oklah we-Oklah), and another transcript was made in the twelfth century by Rabbi Menahem of Joigny. Graetz misinterpreted the first reference to mean that Rabbi Gershom wrote the book, but by Gershom's time this work had long been known and highly valued in Spain, as the quotation from Ibn Janah shows. In the thirteenth century David Kimhi mentioned the work, and in the fourteenth century a copy was taken from Catalonia to Venice.

When Jacob ben Hayyim was editing the Masorah for the Bomberg edition of the Bible (1524–25), he borrowed most of the material for the Masorah Finalis from the Sefer Oklah we-Oklah. Elijah Levita also used the work in his Masoretic studies, describing it as a book small in size but great in value. For three centuries it was supposed to be lost, until it was published by Solomon Frensdorff from a Paris manuscript (Bibliothèque Nationale, MS. No. 148), under the title Das Buch Ochlah W'ochlah (Hanover, 1864). This edition led to the discovery of a second manuscript of the work in the library of the University of Halle, by H. Hupfeld, who described it in the "Z. D. M. G.". Graetz, comparing the Frensdorff edition with the Halle manuscript, showed that the unedited version of the work contained an earlier and more complete text, and also that the version used by Jacob ben Hayyim must have differed from the two preceding recensions. In the Halle manuscript the material is logically arranged in two orders, although this division is not observed in the edition. The manuscript, with which the passages quoted from Rabbi Gershom's copy, as well as the citations in Rashi, agree, includes more than 500 numbers instead of the 374 numbers of the edition, whence it is evident that in the course of time the Oklah we-Oklah received several revisions and amplifications, as Rabbi Jacob Tam had already pointed out when he said that various things were added to the book of "the great Masorah" which did not originally belong to it.

In summing up the evidences and research to date, Bruno Ognibeni (1991) concluded that the text, in a less complete form, predates the 10th Century CE.
