= Thoman =

Thoman is a surname and given name. Notable people with the name include:

surname;

- Camille Thoman, American performance artist, filmmaker, and writer
- István Thomán (1862–1940), Hungarian piano virtuoso and music educator
- Nick Thoman (born 1986), American swimmer
- Tim Thoman (born 1984), American Actor

given name;

- Thoman Burgkmair, father-in-law of Hans Holbein the elder

== See also ==
- Thomann (disambiguation)
