= Wilhelm Krelle =

German economist

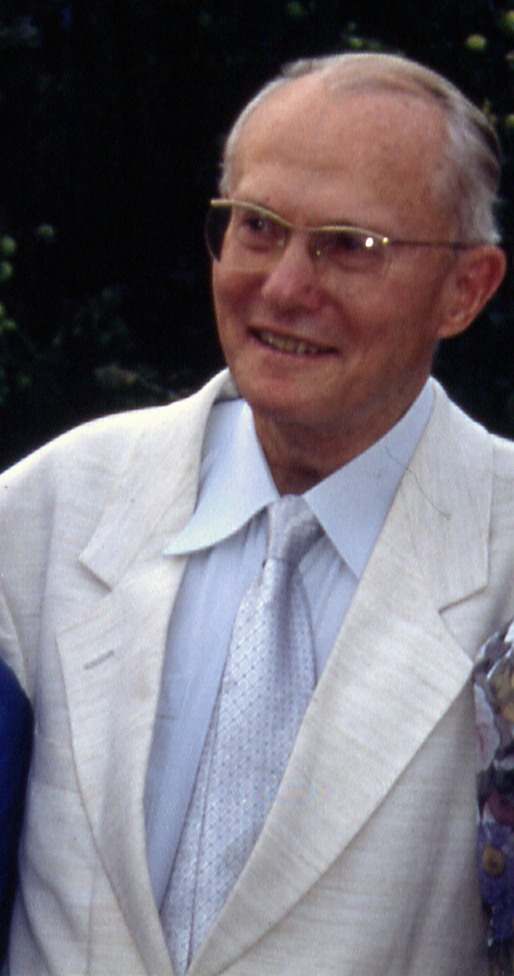
Wilhelm Krelle

Wilhelm Krelle (24 December 1916 – 23 June 2004) was a German economist.

Krelle was born in Magdeburg, Germany. During World War II he served as a Sturmbannführer in the Waffen-SS. After returning from World War II, he studied physics, mathematics and economics in Tübingen and Freiburg. He received his Ph.D. in economics from University of Freiburg in 1948. His thesis advisor was Walter Eucken. In 1951 he received his habilitation from University of Heidelberg, where he was working under Erich Preiser. From 1951 to 1956 he worked as a lecturer at University of Heidelberg and visited Harvard University, Massachusetts Institute of Technology and University of Chicago. In 1956 he was appointed adjunct professor at University of St. Gallen. From 1958 he was a professor of economics at University of Bonn. In 1995 he was awarded with the Gold Kondratieff Medal by the International N. D. Kondratieff Foundation and the Russian Academy of Natural Sciences (RAEN). He died in 2004 in Bonn.
