= Heike Brötz-Oesterhelt =

German microbiologist

- Born: May 12, 1968 (age 56); Neuwied)
- Citizenship: Germany
- Occupation: microbiologist
- Employer: University of Tübingen

Heike Brötz-Oesterhelt (born 12 May 1968, in Neuwied) is a German microbiologist. She is a full professor and holds the Chair of the Department for Microbial Bioactive Compounds at the Interfaculty Institute for Microbiology and Infection Medicine, University of Tübingen, Germany.

== Life ==
Brötz-Oesterhelt studied biology at the University of Bonn, Germany. During her PhD (1993 – 1997) at the Medical Department of the University of Bonn, she specialized in microbiology and antibiotic research. After gaining her doctorate, she went into industry and worked as a senior scientist and project manager at the Anti-Infective Research Department of Bayer HealthCare at the Pharma Research Centre, Wuppertal, Germany. She became Biological Coordinator of Exploratory Antibacterial Research at Bayer HealthCare in 2004. She left Bayer in 2006 and co-founded the company AiCuris, Wuppertal, a biotech spin-off of the antibacterial and antiviral research department of Bayer. From 2006 – 2009, she was Head of Antibacterial Research and from 2009 – 2010 Head of Bacteriology at AiCuris. She returned to the academic world as Professor for Pharmaceutical Biology at the University of Düsseldorf, Germany in 2010. She has been a full professor at the University of Tübingen and a member of the Interfaculty Institute for Microbiology and Infection Medicine since 2014.

== Research ==
Brötz-Oesterhelt's research focuses on discovering and characterizing new antibiotics. She studies molecular mechanisms of antibiotic action and the workings of new antibiotic targets. Her department is dedicated to finding new mechanisms for killing multi-drug resistant bacterial pathogens. She discovered, for example, that nisin and other lantibiotics use the cell wall precursor lipid II as a docking molecule to form pores in the bacterial membrane and that acyldepsipeptide (ADEP) antibiotics deregulate the bacterial Clp protease.

== Awards ==
- Clinical Research and Development Publication Award, Pfizer Inc., 2006
- Research Innovation Prize from Bayer HealthCare AG, 2004
- PhD Award from the German Association for General and Applied Microbiology VAAM, 1998

== Publications ==
- Zipperer, A., Konnerth, M.C., Laux. C., Berscheid, A., Janek, D., Weidenmaier, C., Burian, M., Schilling, N.A., Slavetinsky, C., Marschal, M., Willmann, M., Kalbacher, H., Schittek, B., Brötz-Oesterhelt, H., Grond, S., Peschel, A., Krismer, B. 2016. “Human commensals producing a novel antibiotic impair pathogen colonization.” Nature 535 (7613): 511-6 (2016).
- Gersch, M., Famulla, K., Dahmen, M., Göbl, C., Malik, I., Richter, K., Korotkoc, V.S., Sass, P., Rübsamen-Schaeff, H., Madl, T, Brötz-Oesterhelt, H., and Sieber, p. 2015. “AAA+ chaperones and acyldepsipeptides activate ClpP via conformational control.” Nature Communications 6:6320 (2015).
- Sass, P., M. Josten, K. Famulla, G. Schiffer, H.-G. Sahl, L. Hamoen and H. Brötz-Oesterhelt. “Antibiotic acyldepsipeptides activate ClpP peptidase to degrade the cell division protein FtsZ.” PNAS 108, 17474-17479 (2011).
- Brötz-Oesterhelt, H., D. Beyer, H.-P. Kroll, R. Endermann, C. Ladel, W. Schroeder, B. Hinzen, S. Raddatz, H. Paulsen, K. Henninger, J. E. Bandow, H.-G. Sahl and H. Labischinski. “Dysregulation of bacterial proteolytic machinery by a new class of antibiotics.” Nature Medicine. 11, 1082-1087 (2005).
- Brötz, H., M. Josten, I. Wiedemann, U. Schneider, G. Bierbaum and H.-G. Sahl: “Role of lipid-bound peptidoglycan precursors in the formation of pores by nisin, epidermin and other lantibiotics.” Molecular Microbiology 30, 317-328 (1998).
