= Engineers' Society of Western Pennsylvania =

American organization

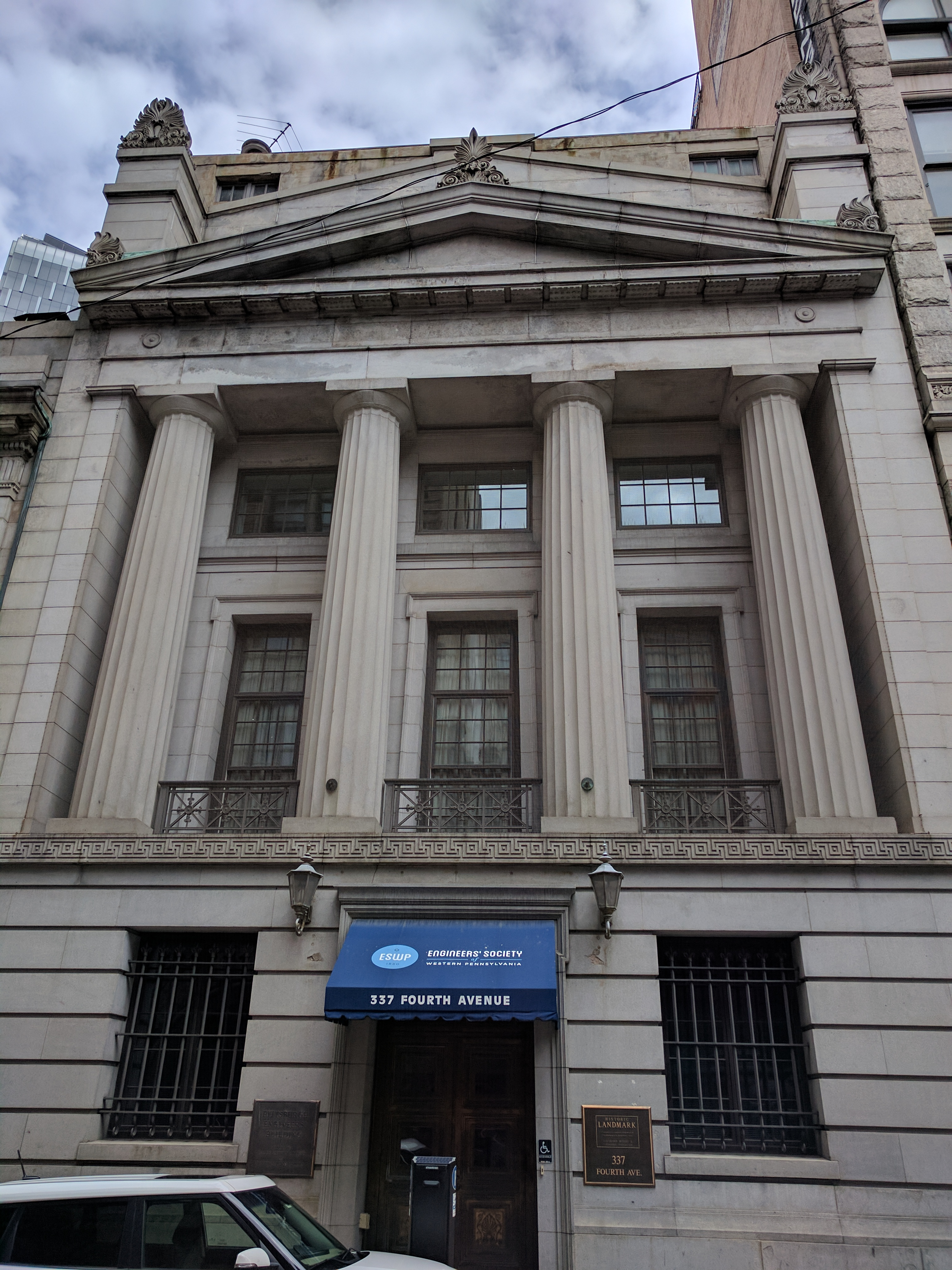
- Formation: 1880
- Type: not-for-profit membership organization
- Headquarters: Pittsburgh, Pennsylvania
- Location(s): 337 Fourth Avenue; Pittsburgh, Pennsylvania; United States
- Members: 1000+
- Official language: English
- President: Stephen G. Shanley, P.E.
- General Manager: David A. Teorsky, CCM
- Website: www.eswp.com

The Engineers' Society of Western Pennsylvania (or ESWP) is a non-profit membership professional association based in Pittsburgh, Pennsylvania. The society was founded in 1880 to "promote social, technical, and business interaction in Western Pennsylvania."

Among other activities, the ESWP is the sponsor of the International Water Conference (IWC) annually since 1940; the International Bridge Conference (IBC) annually since 1983; and is a co-sponsor of the Pennsylvania Brownfields Conference (formerly named the Industrial Site Recycling Conference). ESWP regularly recognizes individuals and projects of distinction with awards and medals during their Annual Engineering Awards Banquet, thought to be the longest-running banquet of its type in America.

== Mission statement ==
The mission of the society is to:

Advance the engineering profession and position Western Pennsylvania as a center of engineering excellence.
