= Alfred Maximilien Bonnet =

German Latinist classical scholar

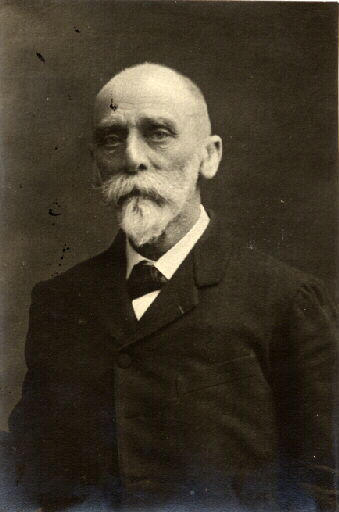
Max Bonnet (ca. 1900)

Alfred Maximilien Bonnet (3 November 1841 – 1917) was a German Latinist classical scholar. He studied at Bonn University, then was a lecturer at Lausanne 1866–74 and in Paris 1874–81, then lecturer and from 1890 professor at the University of Montpellier. He made the first modern editions of various New Testament Apocrypha.

== Works ==
- Narratio de miraculo a Michaele archangelo Chonis patrato, adjecto Symeonis Metaphrastus de eadem re libello (Paris, 1890)
- Le Latin de Gregoire de Tours (1890)

editions

- Latin - The Book of Miracles of the Apostle Andrew (1885)
- Latin - The Acts of Thomas (Leipzig, 1883)
- Latin - The Acts of Andrew (1895)
- Acta apostolorum apocrypha (1891) in collaboration with Richard Adelbert Lipsius.
