= Leschke syndrome =

Medical condition

- Specialty: Medical genetics

Leschke syndrome is a condition characterized by growth retardation and intellectual disability. The syndrome is named after German internist Erich Leschke.

Further symptoms may include diabetes mellitus, genital hypoplasia, and hyperthyroidism.

== See also ==
- Silver–Russell syndrome
- List of cutaneous conditions
