= Karl Martin Menten =

German astronomer (1957–2024)

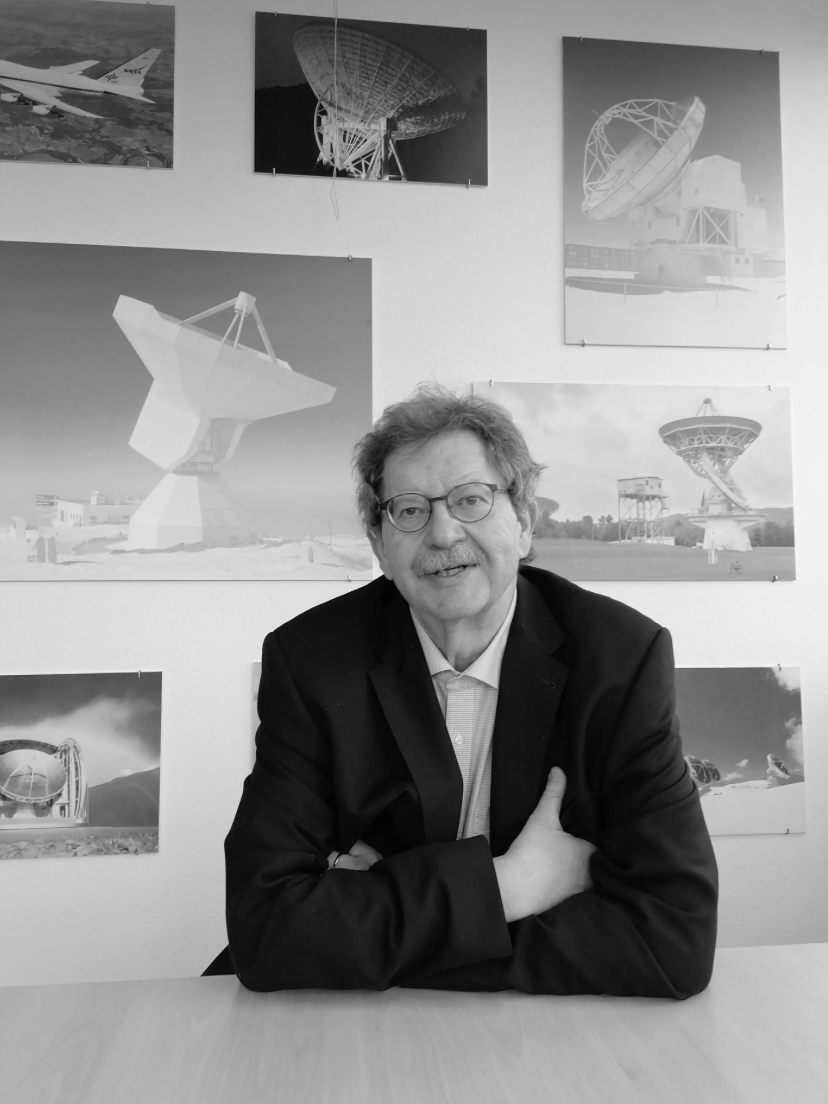
- Born: 3 October 1957; Briedel/Mosel, Germany
- Died: December 30, 2024 (aged 67)
- Citizenship: Germany
- Education: University of Bonn
- Known for: radio astronomy, astrophysical masers, astrometry
- Spouse: Barbara E. Menten
- Children: 2
- Scientific career
- Thesis: Interstellar Methanol towards Galactic HII Regions
- Doctoral advisor: Charles Malcolm Walmsley

Karl Martin Menten was a German astronomer who worked primarily in the field of radio astronomy. At the time of his death on December 30, 2024, he was the director of the Max Planck Institute for Radio Astronomy (MPIfR). As of early 2025, his professional publications had been cited nearly 83,000 times, with an h-index of 136.

Menten was born in Briedel, Germany, in 1957. From 1976 through 1977, he performed his compulsory military service for the Federal Republic of Germany. In 1977 he matriculated at University of Bonn, and received his Doctor rerum naturalium from that university in 1987. Menten became a postdoctoral researcher at the Harvard-Smithsonian Center for Astrophysics, in Cambridge, Massachusetts. He became a Senior Radio Astronomer at the Smithsonian Astrophysical Observatory, and Director for Millimeter and Submillimeter Astronomy at the MPIfR, in 1996. In 2001, Menten became Professor for Experimental Astrophysics at University of Bonn. He was the principal investigator for the Atacama Pathfinder Experiment.

== Research highlights ==
Much of Menten's research involved astrophysical masers. In 1991 he discovered the very strong methanol maser line at 6.6 GHz in regions of star formation, using the 140 foot radio telescope at Green Bank Observatory. This spectral line became a power tool for studying the formation of massive stars.

In 1991 he, along with Gary Melnick and Tom Phillips, announced the first astronomical detection of the water maser lines at 321 and 325 GHz. He also made the first detection of the water maser line at 658 GHz, in 1995. These detections were made at the Caltech Submillimeter Observatory.

Menten was part of a collaboration which, in 2009, used VLBI observations of the 12 GHz methanol maser line to refine the Milky Way's rotation curve and the estimated distance to the Galactic Center.

In 2010, Menten, along with Mark Reid, founded the Bar and Spiral Structure Legacy (BeSSeL) Survey, an NRAO VLBA Key Science project which uses maser observations with the VLBA to provide trigonometric parallax and proper motion measurements of star formation regions across the Milky Way. This is a ground-based project that provides parallax measurements as accurate as the space-based Gaia results, but unlike Gaia, BeSSeL is relatively unaffected by interstellar extinction, allowing the entire galactic plane to be mapped.

Menten was a member of the Event Horizon Telescope (EHT) collaboration which revealed the first image of a black hole in 2019.

== Awards and honors ==
- (2000) Honorary Professor, University of Bonn
- (2007) 42nd annual Karl G. Jansky Lectureship
- (2012) Honorary Fellow of the RAS
- (2019) NSF Diamond Achievement Award (as a member of the EHT team)
- (2020) Breakthrough Prize in Fundamental Physics (as a member of the EHT team)
- (2021) Royal Astronomical Society Group Award (as a member of the EHT team)
