= Wolfgang Bernhard Fränkel =

Wolfgang Bernhard Fränkel (Bonn, 11 November 1795; Elberfeld - 5 March 1851) was a German medical doctor and writer. He participated in the Napoleonic Wars, starting 1812 in the Napoleoneon army, later as a lieutenant in the anti-Napoleon-coalition. Later he studied at the gymnasium and the University of Bonn and became doctor of medicine in 1824. He then became a physician in Elberfeld until his death. In 1840 he converted to the Christian religion. His son was the physician and professor Bernhard Fränkel.

== Works ==
- Ueber die wichtigsten Gegenstände des ehelichen Lebens, Elberfeld und Barmen 1829
- Die Flechten und Ihre Behandlung, Elberfeld 1830
- Das Bekenntniss des Proselyten, das Unglück der Juden und Ihre Emancipation in Deutschland, Elberfeld 1841
- Die Unmöglichkeit der Emancipation der Juden im Christlichen Staat, Elberfeld 1841
- Die Rabbiner-Versammlung und der Reform-Verein, Elberfeld 1844

== Links ==
- Article in the Jewish Encyklopedia 1906
- online edition of Das Bekenntnis des Proselyten
