= Max Joseph Becker =

American civil engineer (1828–1896)

- Born: June 20, 1828; Coblenz, Kingdom of Prussia
- Died: August 23, 1896 (aged 68); Mackinac Island, Michigan
- Education: University of Bonn
- Occupation: Civil engineer

Max Joseph Becker (June 20, 1828 – August 23, 1896) was a Prussian-born American civil engineer who served as a railroad and civil engineer. He was president of the American Society of Civil Engineers in 1889, and the president of the Engineers' Society of Western Pennsylvania in 1893.

== Biography ==
Max Joseph Becker was born at Coblenz, Kingdom of Prussia June 20, 1828, and was educated in the schools of Coblenz, and at the University of Bonn.

After leaving the University he passed the requisite examinations for admission to service on the Government Railroad surveys and in 1848 began his professional career on the Cologne and Minden Railroad in the capacity of engineer's apprentice (rodman), with headquarters at Hamm in Westphalia.

This work was interrupted by the Rebellion of 1848 and by reason of his connection therewith he was compelled to leave Prussia along with such men as Frederick Hecker, Carl Schurz, Franz Sigel, August Willich and others whose enforced exile has been our country's gain.

After a brief sojourn in Switzerland he came to the United States, landing in New York City in 1850. His first year's residence in this country was a struggle for a foothold, during which he tried various lines of employment, among others, making surveys in Connecticut for a map publishing house, as draftsman in an engraving establishment, and even tried his hand at journalism on the staff of the Abendzeitung.

In December 1851 he entered the service of the Steubenville and Indiana Railroad at Steubenville, Ohio, under Jacob Blickensderfer Jr, Mem. ASCE, Chief Engineer. His first service with this company was as a draftsman, but this was soon changed to transitman on location and then to Resident Engineer on construction in which capacity he continued until the completion of the road in 1854.

From 1854 to 1856 he held no salaried position, doing such professional work as offered and occupying a part of his time in making and publishing a map of Coshocton County, Ohio. In 1856 he entered the service of the State of Ohio as Resident Engineer on the Ohio Canal and continued in that position until 1859. From 1859 to 1861 he was Resident Engineer on the Marietta and Cincinnati Railroad, in charge of location and construction.

During this time he also rebuilt a suspension bridge over the Scioto River at Portsmouth, Ohio, which had been destroyed by the undermining of one tower during a flood. During the presidential campaign of 1860, Becker took a lively interest in the success of the Republican party and made numerous speeches in German in various towns and cities of Southern Ohio where the German element was strong. In appreciation of this Abraham Lincoln commissioned him Postmaster at Portsmouth, Ohio. But the drudgery and the red tape methods of that office were not suited to his taste and in 1862 he resigned the office and again took service under his former chief Jacob Blickensderfer Jr., at that time Chief Engineer of the Pittsburgh and Steubenville Railroad. Becker was placed in charge of construction of the Steubenville Bridge and its approaches, one of the most important structures crossing the Ohio River and subsequently rebuilt by him.

In 1863 he again went to the Marietta and Cincinnati Railroad to lead the location's construction of its extension from Loveland, Ohio, to Cincinnati. His connection with this railroad company continued until 1867 when he became Chief Engineer of the Steubenville and Indiana Railroad, which he continued to maintain during the company's consolidation with other roads until he had charge of the entire system of the Pittsburgh, Cincinnati, Chicago and St. Louis Railroad.

In January 1893 the Board of Directors sought to make his declining years easier and to that end relieved him of some of his duties and changed his title to "Consulting Engineer and Real Estate Agent".

He died at Mackinac Island, Michigan on August 23, 1896.

Becker's professional and personal standing among engineers was of the highest; he was an honored and beloved member of the Engineers' Society of Western Pennsylvania; he was a member of its Board of Direction for many years, and was President for 1893.

Becker was elected a Member of the American Society of Civil Engineers (ASCE) on August 7, 1872, and was made its president in 1889. At the time of his election, his personal acquaintance in the society was not very large, and some questions were asked; before his term had expired he had won all hearts, as he always did wherever he came into touch with people.

It must also be remembered that, while president in 1889, Becker served on the ASCE committee to examine the cause of the Johnstown, PA disaster. The breach of the South Fork Dam had killed over 2,200 people, most of whom were women and children. The other three engineers on the committee included the well-known hydraulic engineers James B. Francis, William Ezra Worthen, and Alphonse Fteley. Although the report was completed by January 1890, it was immediately suppressed and not released to other ASCE members or the public until mid-1891, two years after the 1889 flood. James Francis presented the results of the investigation at the ASCE convention in Chattanooga, TN. The other three committee members did not attend this long-awaited report. Although Francis' name headed the report, the de facto chairman of the committee was Becker, who had virtually no experience in dams or hydraulic engineering. According to James Francis, it was Becker who delayed the release of the report. The new ASCE president in 1890, William Shinn, had placed it in the hands of Becker to decide when to release it. Shinn was a close business associate of Andrew Carnegie, who had been a member of the South Fork Fishing and Hunting Club. That club had owned the failed South Fork dam. A detailed discussion of the South Fork investigation, the participating engineers, and the science behind the 1889 flood was published in 2018.
