= Solomon Frensdorff =

German Jewish Hebraist

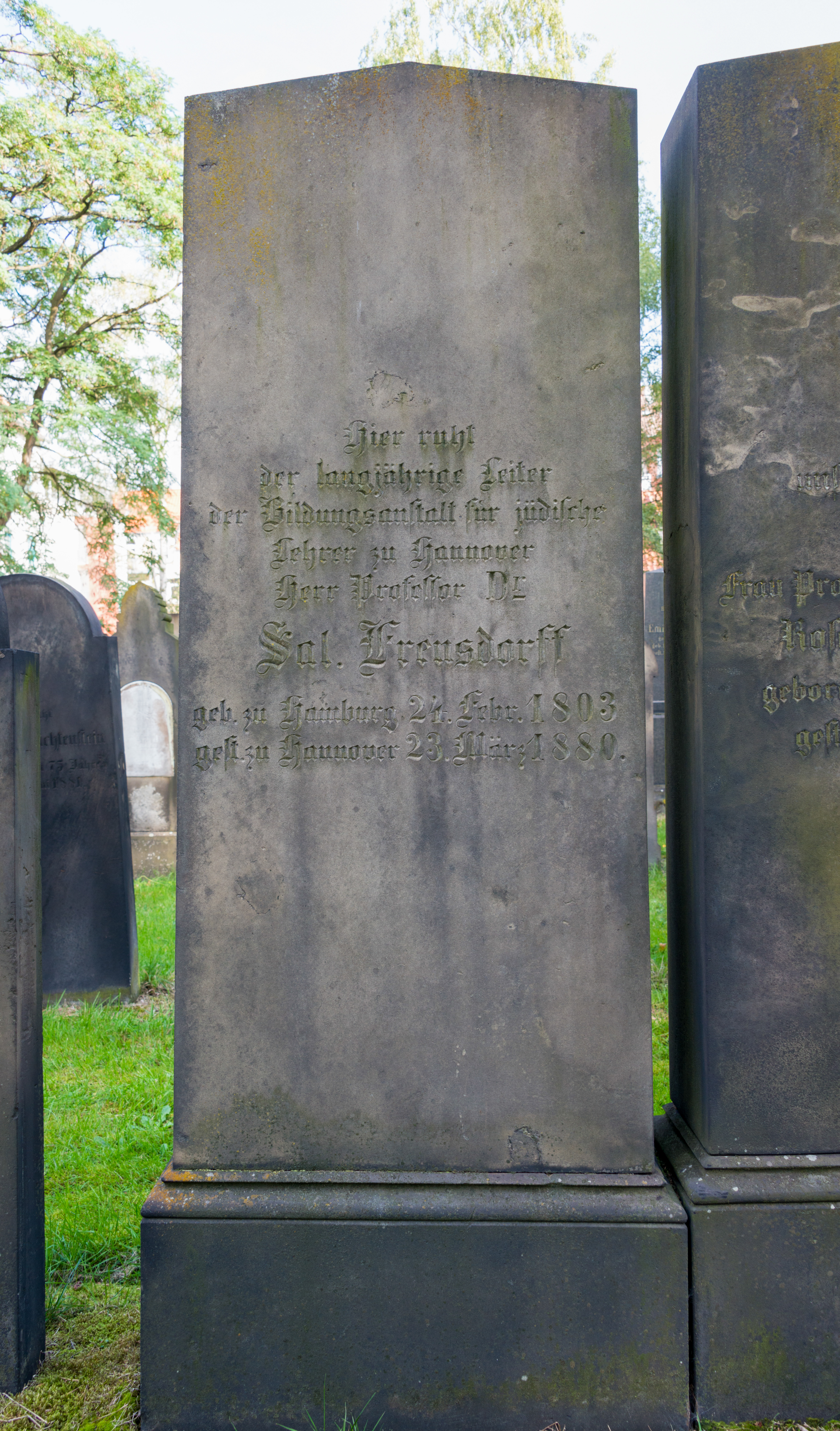
- Solomon Frensdorf German side of tombstone
- Born: 1803; Hamburg, Germany
- Died: 1880 (aged 76–77); Hanover, Germany
- Occupation: Hebraist

Solomon Frensdorff (born at Hamburg, February 24, 1803; died at Hanover, March 23, 1880) was a German Jewish Hebraist.

While pursuing his studies at the Johanneum gymnasium in Hamburg, he was introduced to Hebrew literature by Isaac Bernays, who exerted considerable influence upon his later attitude toward Judaism, and religion in general. He studied philosophy and Semitic languages at the University of Bonn. In that city he became acquainted with Abraham Geiger, who, in various letters to his friends, repeatedly expressed esteem for Frensdorff's character and learning.

In 1837 Frensdorff became head master of the Jewish religious school at Hanover, and in 1848 was appointed principal of the new Jewish seminary for teachers in that city, which position he held until his death.

Frensdorff throughout his career devoted himself chiefly to the critical examination and publication of Masoretic works. His writings on these are:

- Fragmente aus der Punktations-und Accentlehre der Hebräischen Sprache, with the Hebrew text (Darke ha-Niḳḳud weha-Neginot), ascribed to R. Moses Punctator, Hanover, 1847 (dedicated to Bernays);
- Oklah we-Oklah, ib. 1864
- Die Massora Magna part i.
- Massoretisches Wörterbuch, Leipsic and Hanover, 1876
- Aus dem Sefer ha-Zikronot des Elias Levita in "Monatsschrift," xii. 96 et seq.
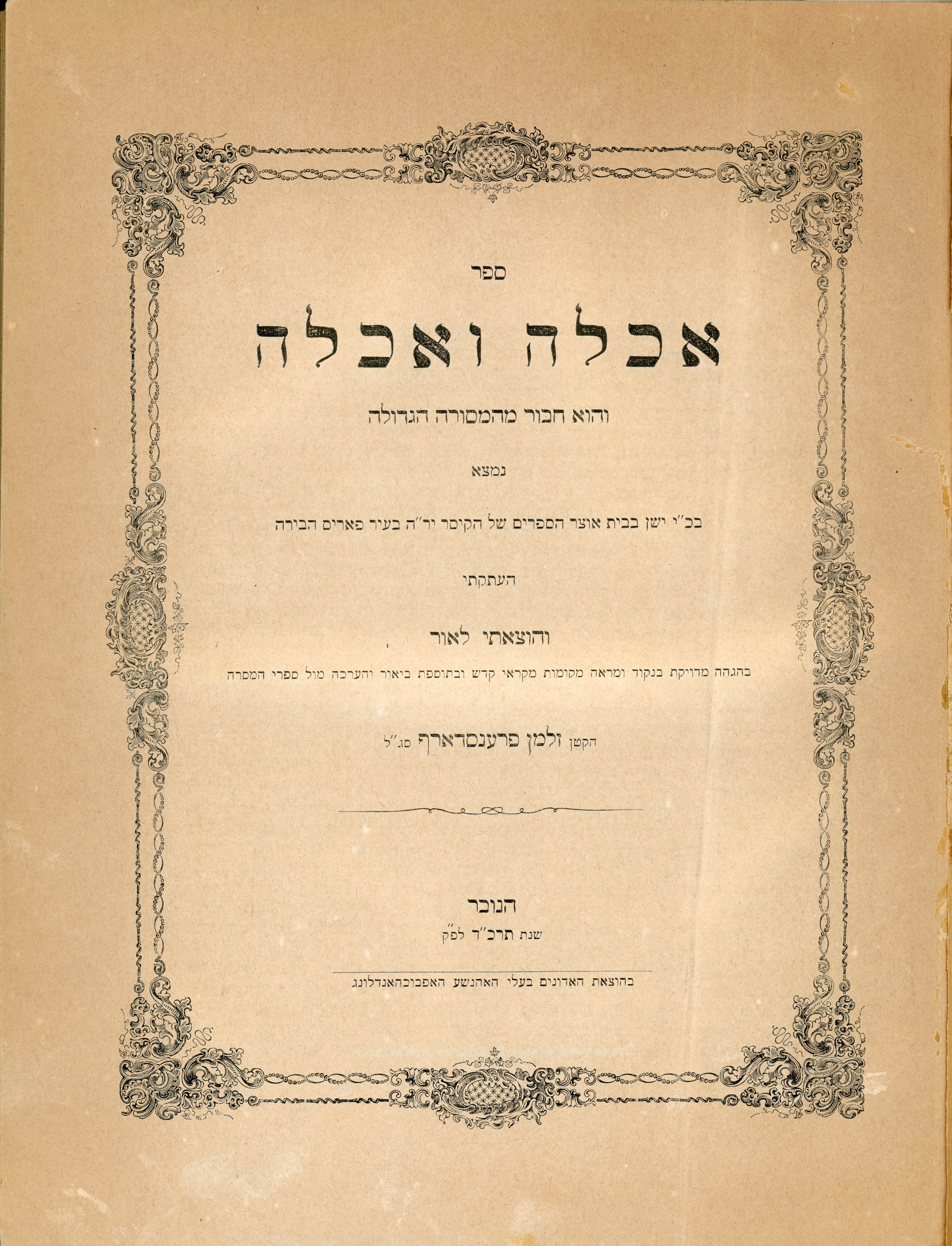
Hebrew title page of "Das Buch Ochlah W'Ochlah" by Solomon Frensdorff

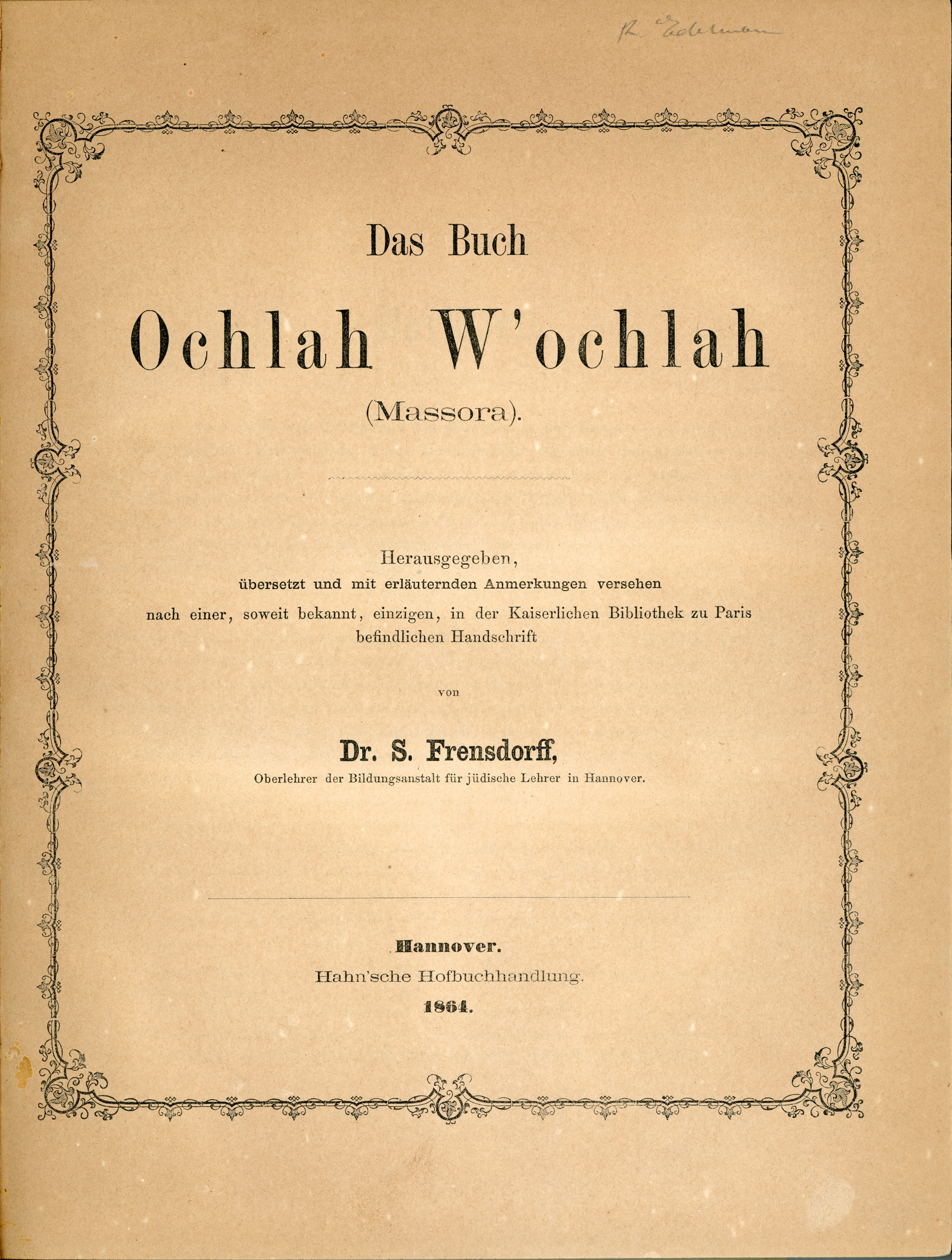
German title page of "Das Buch Ochlah W'Ochlah" by Solomon Frensdorff

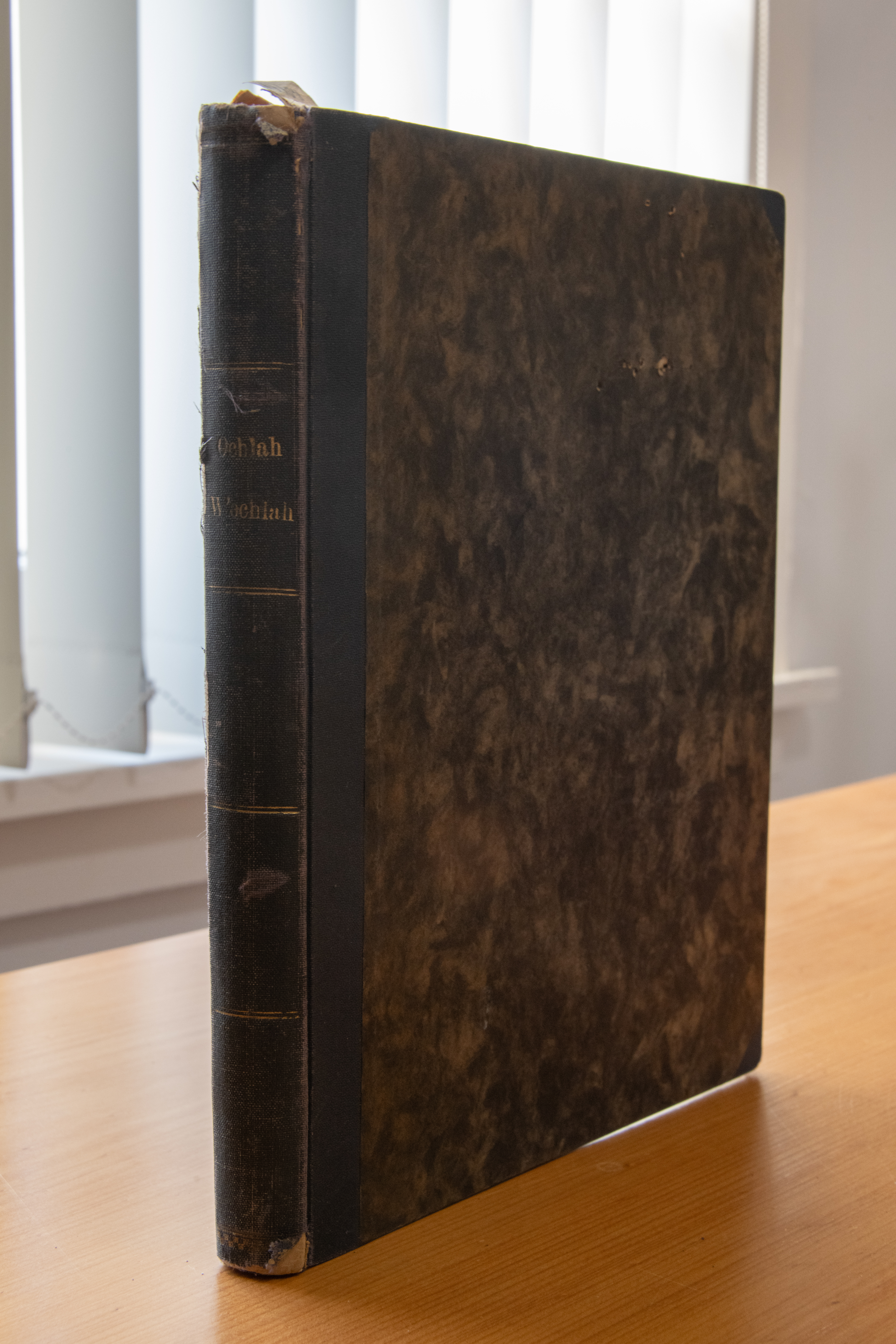
Cover of "Das Buch Ochlah W'Ochlah"

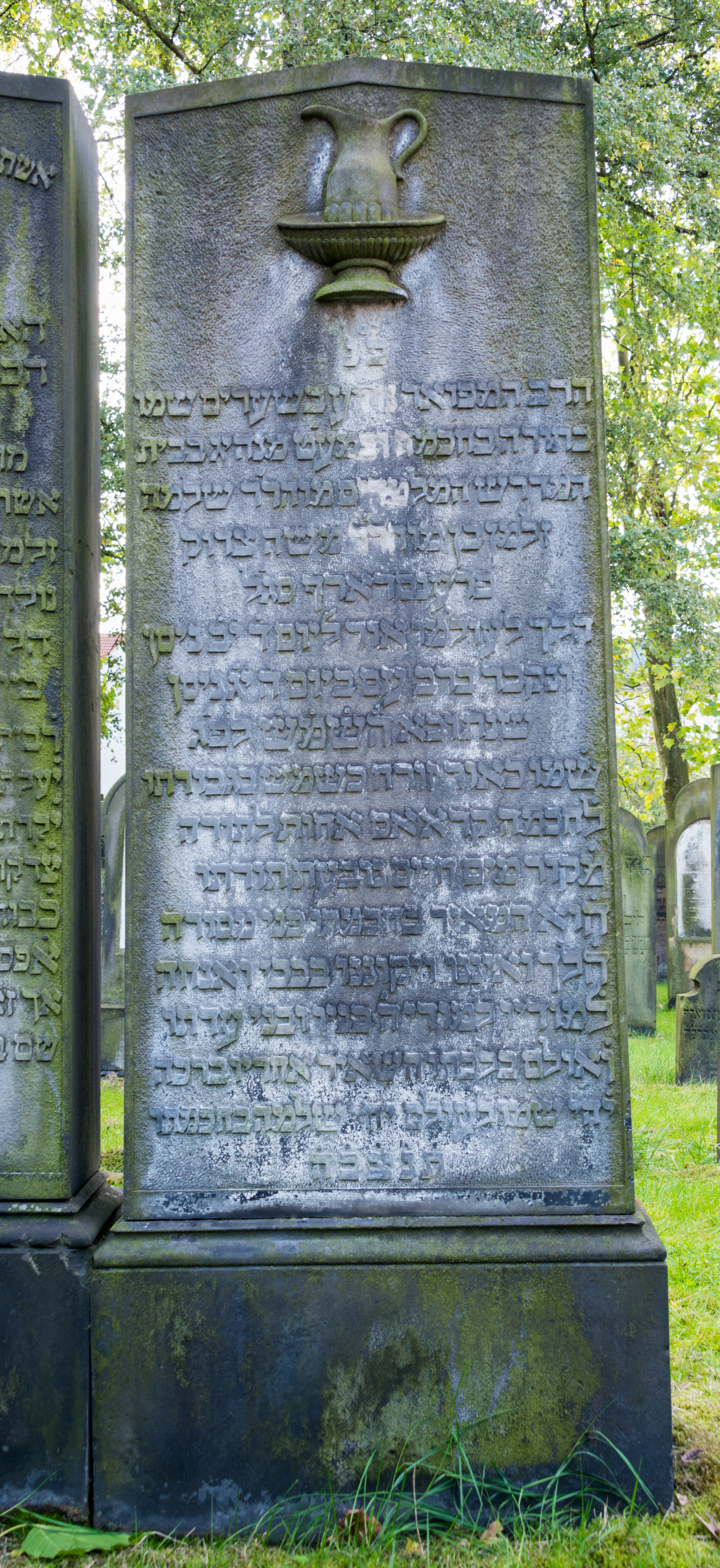
Solomon Frensdorf Hebrew side of tombstone

== Bibliography (selection) ==
- Okhlah ṿe-okhlah: ṿe-hu ḥibur meha-masorah ha-gedolah … : nimtsa bi-khetav [Edition eines seit dem 10. Jh. bekannten anonymen Kompilats masoretischer Anmerkungen unter dem Titel אָכְלָה וְאָכְלָה], Hahn, Hannover 1861, u.a.;
  Digitalisat: Frensdorff 1864 at Bavarian State Library
