= Martina Havenith-Newen =

German chemist

- Born: Martina Havenith
- Education: University of Bonn
- Scientific career
- Thesis: Infrared spectroscopy of van der Waals complexes and ions (1990)

Martina Havenith-Newen (born 13 April 1963 in Mechernich) is a German chemist.

== Education and career ==
She studied physics and mathematics at the University of Bonn from 1981 to 1987. She finished her doctorate in physics in 1990 and completed her habilitation in 1997.

Since 1998, she is a professor at the Ruhr University Bochum.

== Research ==
Her research focuses on intermolecular interactions, aggregation, solvation, molecular recognition, and infra-red and THz spectroscopy.

== Selected publications ==
- Ebbinghaus, S.; Kim, S. J.; Heyden, M.; Yu, X.; Heugen, U.; Gruebele, M.; Leitner, D. M.; Havenith, M. (2007-12-26). "An extended dynamical hydration shell around proteins". Proceedings of the National Academy of Sciences. 104 (52): 20749–20752. Bibcode:2007PNAS..10420749E. doi:10.1073/pnas.0709207104. ISSN 0027-8424. PMC 2410073. PMID 18093918.
- Heugen, U.; Schwaab, G.; Brundermann, E.; Heyden, M.; Yu, X.; Leitner, D. M.; Havenith, M. (2006-08-15). "Solute-induced retardation of water dynamics probed directly by terahertz spectroscopy". Proceedings of the National Academy of Sciences. 103 (33): 12301–12306. Bibcode:2006PNAS..10312301H. doi:10.1073/pnas.0604897103. ISSN 0027-8424. PMC 1567875. PMID 16895986.

== Awards ==
She is a member of the Academy of Sciences Leopoldina, the Academy of Europe, and the Österreichischer Wissenschaftsrat.
