= Hanns Christian Löhr =

German historian

Hanns Christian Löhr (born 1961 in Marburg/Lahn) is a German historian.

== Youth and education ==
Hanns Christian Löhr grew up in West Germany. After graduating from high school, he studied ancient, medieval and contemporary history as well as philosophy at the University of Hamburg and the University of Bonn. He completed his studies in 1988 with a master of arts degree. In 1992 he received his Ph.D. from the University of Bonn in history under Klaus Hildebrand, with a thesis on the foundation of the modern state of Albania and the outbreak of the First World War.

== Scientific activity ==
Loehr's first book described the privatization of East German agriculture by the "Treuhandanstalt Berlin". Later he concentrated his scientific research on National Socialist art theft. In the course of this work he evaluated the photo file of the special commission Linz ("Sonderauftrag Linz") for the Führermuseum and the so called Führerbaukartei, which he was the first to identify in the archive of the former regional tax office Berlin, which was not open to the public at the time. Both card indexes show a large part of the works of art acquired by Adolf Hitler. As a result, a monograph on Hitler's looted art organization was published in 2005. In 2009 he published an analog work on the collection of Hermann Göring. In 2018, the last work in this series to appear was a study on the art theft carried out by Hitler's chief ideologist Alfred Rosenberg during the Second World War. Löhr thus published a trilogy on the three important National Socialist art thefts.

The three books each contain a catalogue of lost works of art that have been missing since 1945. He published photographs of objects that had previously been largely unknown to researchers. In September 2009, the Bavarian State Criminal Police Office, together with the Central Institute for Art History in Munich, secured the painting "The Sermon on the Mount" by Frans Francken the Younger, which he had listed as a loss from Hitler's collection in his book The Brown House of Art. He supplemented his academic work on National Socialist cultural policy with a study on the architectural and cultural plans, which Hitler wanted to realize in his former hometown of Linz on the Danube.

In 2021 Löhr participated in the French database Répertoire des acteurs du marché de l'art en France sous l'Occupation, 1940-1945, RAMA as an author.

== Activity as editor ==
Together with the foundation German Historical Museum (represented by curator Monika Flacke) and the former Federal Office for Open Property Issues (represented by staff Angelika Enderlein), Löhr published the database on the "Special Commission Linz" on the Internet in 2008, which lists all works of art acquired for Hitler between 1939 and 1945. An analogous database was published by the same working group in 2012 for the Goering Collection.

Löhr lives and works as a provenance researcher in Berlin.

== Books ==
- Der Kampf um das Volkseigentum, Die Privatisierung der ehemaligen staatlichen DDR- Landwirtschaft durch die Treuhandanstalt 1990-1994, Duncker und Humblot Berlin 2002, ISBN 978-3-428-10475-8. (The struggle for the people's property, the privatization process of the former state-owned GDR agriculture by the Treuhandanstalt 1990-1994.)
- Die Gründung Albaniens, Wilhelm zu Wied und die Balkandiplomatie der Großmaechte 1912-1914, Peter Lang, Frankfurt/Main 2010, ISBN 978-3-631-60117-4. (The Foundation of Albania, Wilhelm zu Wied and the Balkan Diplomacy of the Great Powers 1912-1914.)
- Der Eiserne Sammler, Die Kollektion Hermann Goering, Kunst und Korruption im „Dritten Reich“ , Gebr. Mann Verlag Berlin 2009. ISBN 978-3-7861-2601-0. (The Iron Collector, The Hermann Goering Collection, Art and Corruption in the "Third Reich".) (Spanish translation: El mercader de la muerte, Edhasa Barcelona 2012, ISBN 978-987-628-170-6). Review by: Elizabeth Otto, in: German studies review, Vol 34, No. 3, October 2011 pp. 669-671.
- Hitlers Linz, Im Heimatgau des „Fuehrers“ , (Hitler's Linz, In the Homeland of the "Fuehrer".) Ch. Links Verlag, Berlin 2013, ISBN 978-3-86153-736-6.
- Das Braune Haus der Kunst, Hitler und der Sonderauftrag Linz, Visionen, Verbrechen und Verluste, 1. edition: Akademie-Verlag Berlin 2005, ISBN 978-3-0500-41568; 2. edition: Gebr. Mann-Verlag Berlin 2016, ISBN 978-3-7861-2736-9. (The Brown House of Art, Hitler and the special commission Linz, visions, crimes and losses.) (Chinese translation: 第三帝国的艺术博物馆, SDX Joint Publishing Peking 2009, ISBN 978-7-108-03311-6.). Review by Deutsche Welle on 8-24-2005.
- Kunst als Waffe, Der Einsatzstab Reichsleiter Rosenberg, Ideologie und Kulturgutraub im „Dritten Reich“ , Gebr. Mann Verlag Berlin 2018, ISBN 978-3-7861-2806-9. (Art as a Weapon, The Task Force Reichsleiter Rosenberg, Ideology and theft of Cultural Property in the "Third Reich".) Review by: Jean Marc Dreyfus, The Nazi looting Organisations and art after the Holocaust, in: The Art Newspaper, No. 311, April 2019, Review, p. 12.
