= Barend Christiaan van Calker =

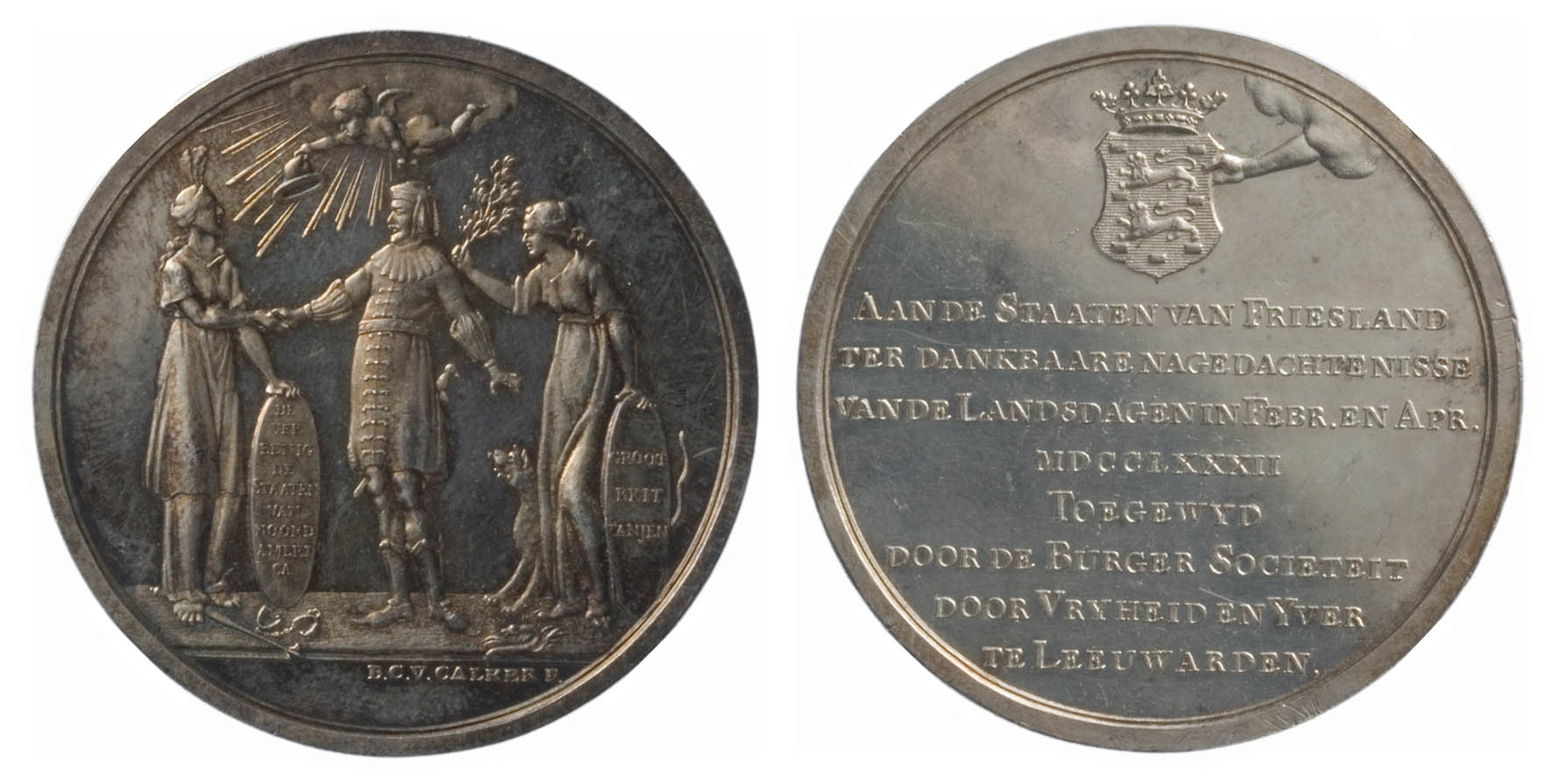
Friesland's acceptance of the Peace treaty by John Adams, representative of the United States, and the rejection of a separate Peace treaty with England, silver commemorative medal, 1782, collection Teylers Museum

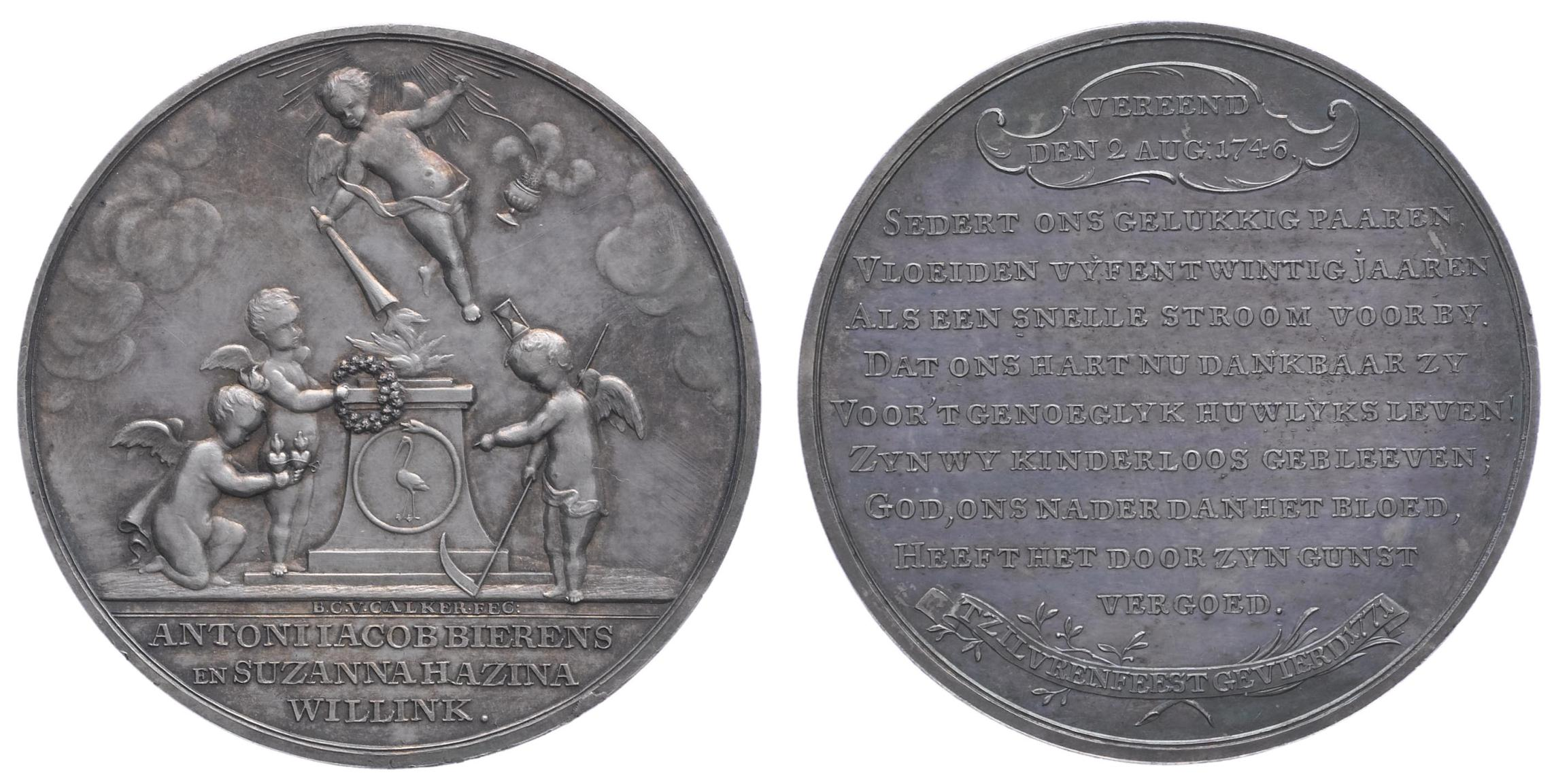
Medal to commemorate the 25th anniversary of the marriage of Antony Jacob Bierens and Suzanna Hazina Willink in 1771, collection Amsterdam Museum

Barend Christiaan van Calker (1738 – 1813), was a Dutch medallist.

== Biography ==
He was born in Kampen and became a master medallist who fulfilled commissions for members of the House of Orange, including a birthday medallion for Willem Frederik van Oranje in 1772. Like Johann Georg Holtzhey, he is especially known for his awards medals and commemorative medals, and like him also made a medal for the recognition of the United States in 1782. He made prize medals for the Provinciaal Utrechtsch Genootschap van Kunsten en Wetenschappen in 1773 and the 200-year anniversary medal of Leiden University in 1775. He lived in the Hernhutter Broedergemeenschap, near Castle Zeist where he later died.
