= Horst Ueberhorst =

German historian

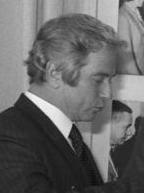
Bundesarchiv B 145 Bild-F062233-0020, Bonn, Landesvertretung Nordrhein-Westfalen

Horst Ueberhorst (25 February 1925 – 19 December 2010) was a German sport historian. His six-volume world sport history of over 150 countries and a total of 3,982 pages is the most comprehensive systematic collection of the development of sports in the world. The European Committee for Sport History is honoring him annually by presenting the Horst Ueberhorst Honorary (since 2011 Memorial) Address He was professor of sport history and founding Dean of the Faculty of Sport Sciences at the Ruhr-University in Bochum. After graduation from high school and a short voluntary service in the Army, Ueberhorst studied Sport, History, Germanic Languages and Protestant Religious Studies at the University of Bonn. After his teaching credential he taught at a grammar school in Bad Godesberg and continued his education at nearby Bonn where he received his PhD in 1952. He continued teaching at Bad Godesberg and part time at the Physical Education Department at the University of Bonn. In 1970 he started to work in the State Ministry of Education of North Rhine Westphalia. In this position he was in charge of the physical education teacher training in the state. When the newly founded Ruhr University in Bochum received a Physical Education Department (later Faculty) he was made the first Chairperson later Dean. Here he continued as full professor until his retirement in 1992 and remained one of the most productive German sports historians. In 1991 he was honored by an international Festschrift. and received the Order of Merit of the Federal Republic of Germany. He was several times guest professor in the United States e.g. at the University of Massachusetts. He was coopted as an International Fellow der National Academy of Kinesiology and Fellow des European Committee for Sports History. The WorldCat has 169 books of/about him.

== Publications ==
- Von Athen bis München. Bartels und Wernitz, München 1969. 2. Auflage: 1971, ISBN 3-87039-931-7.
- Zurück zu Jahn? Universitätsverlag, Bochum 1969.
- Elite für die Diktatur. Droste, Düsseldorf 1969. Nachdruck 1980, ISBN 3-7610-7232-5.mund Neuendorff. Turnführer ins Dritte Reich (= Turn- und Sportführer im Dritten Reich. Band 1). Bartels und Wernitz, Berlin 1970, ISBN 3-87039-921-X.
- Frisch, frei, stark und treu. Droste, Düsseldorf 1973, ISBN 3-7700-0356-X.
- Carl Krümmel und die nationalsozialistische Leibeserziehung (= Turn- und Sportführer im Dritten Reich. Band 4). Bartels und Wernitz, Berlin 1976, ISBN 3-87039-976-7.
- Turner unterm Sternenbanner. Moos, München 1978, ISBN 3-7879-0135-3.
- Friedrich Wilhelm von Steuben. 1730–1794. Moos, München 1981, ISBN 3-7879-0183-3.
- Hundert Jahre Deutscher Ruderverband. Hrsg. Deutscher Ruderverband. Philler, Minden 1983, ISBN 3-7907-3100-5.
- Vergangen, nicht vergessen, Sportkultur im deutschen Osten und im Sudetenland. Von den Anfängen bis 1945. Droste, Düsseldorf 1992, ISBN 3-7700-0967-3.
- Sport im Ruhrgebiet : seine Sozialgeschichte. Recklinghausen Ruhrfestspiele 1986
- Arbeitersport- und Arbeiterkulturbewegung im Ruhrgebiet. Forschungsberichte des Landes Nordrhein-Westfalen, Fachgruppe Wirtschafts- und Sozialwissenschaften, vol. 3235. ISBN 9783531032351

== Editorships ==
Turn- und Sportführer im Dritten Reich. Bartels und Wernitz, Berlin 1970–1976.

- Band 1: Horst Ueberhorst: Edmund Neuendorff. Turnführer ins Dritte Reich. 1970, ISBN 3-87039-921-X.
- Band 2: Dieter Steinhöfer: Hans von Tschammer und Osten. Reichssportführer im Dritten Reich. 1973, ISBN 3-87039-945-7.
- Band 3: Arnd Krüger: Theodor Lewald. Sportführer ins Dritte Reich. 1975, ISBN 3-87039-954-6.
- Band 4: Horst Ueberhorst: Carl Krümmel und die nationalsozialistische Leibeserziehung. 1976, ISBN 3-87039-976-7.
- Band 5: Hajo Bernett: Guido von Mengden. „Generalstabschef“ des deutschen Sports. 1976, ISBN 3-87039-001-8.

Geschichte der Leibesübungen. Bartels und Wernitz, Berlin 1972–1989.

- Band 1: Ursprungstheorien. 1972, ISBN 3-87039-928-7. pp. 623
- Band 2: Leibesübungen und Sport in der Antike. 1978, ISBN 3-87039-996-1. pp. 342
- Band 3/1: Leibesübungen und Sport in Deutschland von den Anfängen bis zum Ersten Weltkrieg. 1980, ISBN 3-87039-036-0. pp. 593
- Band 3/2: Leibesübungen und Sport in Deutschland vom Ersten Weltkrieg bis zur Gegenwart. 1981, ISBN 3-87039-054-9. pp. 623
- Band 4: Die großen Sportnationen. 1972, ISBN 3-87039-946-5. pp. 234
- Band 5: Leibesübungen und Sport in Europa. 1976, ISBN 3-87039-980-5. pp. 445
- Band 6: Perspektiven des Weltsports. Unter Mitarbeit von Erich Beyer und Werner Sonnenschein. 1989, ISBN 3-87039-081-6. pp. 1,232
