= Norbert Bartel =

Canadian physicist and astronomer

Norbert Bartel is a Canadian physicist and astronomer, currently a Distinguished Research Professor at York University.

== Education ==
Studying in Germany, Bartel received a Vordiplom in Physics from University of Hamburg in 1972 and a M.Sc. Diplom in Physics from the University of Bonn, in 1975. He received a PhD in Physics and Astronomy from the University of Bonn and the Max Planck Institute for Radio Astronomy in 1978.

== Career ==
From 1983 until 1992 Bartel was a research associate at the Harvard-Smithsonian Center for Astrophysics. In 1992, he joined the faculty of the York University Department of Physics and Astronomy.

His research involves using very-long-baseline interferometry (VLBI) radio astronomy to study the structure and evolution of supernova remnants, pulsar wind nebulae and active galactic nuclei.

== Awards and recognition ==
In 1978, Bartel received the Max Planck Society Otto Hahn Medal. In 2006, he was appointed a Distinguished Research Professor at York University.
