= Olaf Lechtenfeld =

German physicist

Olaf Klaus Lechtenfeld
- Born: 30 October 1959 (age 66); Koblenz, Germany
- Occupations: Mathematical physicist, academic and researcher

Academic background
- Education: Degree in Physics and Mathematics; Ph.D., Theoretical Physics
- Alma mater: University of Bonn
- Thesis: Construction of the Nicolai map in supersymmetric field theories

Academic work
- Institutions: Leibniz University Hannover
- Notable students: Jan Christoph Plefka
- Website: olaf-lechtenfeld.de

Olaf Lechtenfeld is a German mathematical physicist, academic and researcher. He is a full professor at the Institute of Theoretical Physics at Leibniz University, where he founded the Riemann Center for Geometry and Physics.

Lechtenfeld's research is focused on string theory, gauge theory and integrable models. He has published over 200 research papers on mathematical physics, classical and quantum field theory, gravitation, supersymmetry and integrable many-body systems.

Lechtenfeld has a second career in amateur sports. He finished 25 marathons and numerous triathlons (including 11 ironman races) and twice competed in the Ironman World Championship at Hawaiʻi.

== Education ==
Lechtenfeld was a student of physics and mathematics at University of Bonn. He completed his Diploma degree in 1982 and received his doctoral degree in 1984 from the university.

== Career ==
After his Ph.D., Lechtenfeld became a Research Fellow at CERN from 1985 till 1987. Lechtenfeld then took up the position of a research associate at City College of New York till 1990. For the subsequent two years, he was a Member of the Institute for Advanced Study in Princeton. In 1992, he moved from the US back to Germany and was appointed by the University of Hannover (later renamed Leibniz University) as a professor of theoretical physics.

Lechtenfeld also held administrative appointments. He served as the founding dean of the Faculty of Mathematics and Physics at the university from 2005 till 2007. Between 2007 and 2014, Lechtenfeld was responsible for the Research Area "Space-Time" as a PI at the Cluster of Excellence QUEST. From 2011 till 2018, he headed the Riemann Center for Geometry and Physics. Since 1995 he runs the annual Saalburg Summer School on Foundations and New Methods in Theoretical Physics.

== Research ==
Lechtenfeld has worked on mathematical physics, classical and quantum field theory, gravitation, supersymmetry and integrable many-body systems. A significant part of his research is focused on string theory.

=== Finite groups, mean fields, and supersymmetry ===
Lechtenfeld started his research in the early 1980s, with the representation theory of finite subgroups of SU(n). After obtaining his physics degree for introducing optimized mean fields for atoms, he discovered during his PhD a systematic construction of the Nicolai map for globally supersymmetric field theories. This allowed for its perturbative diagrammatic computation and established the existence of stochastic variables in certain theories.

35 years later, Lechtenfeld returned to the Nicolai map for supersymmetric Yang–Mills theory with an extension to all critical dimensions and an explicit complete evaluation to third order in the coupling.

=== String theory ===
Lechtenfeld has conducted significant research in string theory; after his Ph.D. he started working on this and related research areas in the second half of the 1980s. As a postdoc at CERN, Lechtenfeld developed conformal field methods for the computation of superstring scattering amplitudes, refining the bosonized vertex operator construction and applying it to four- and six-fermion scattering. After moving to the City College of New York, he pushed this approach to higher loops, including bosonization on higher-genus Riemann surfaces. In particular, he found a new fermionic representation of beta-gamma systems by employing Fay's trisecant identity. He also developed off-shell conformal methods for superstring field theory. Lechtenfeld then worked on random matrix models of two-dimensional quantum gravity, a topic he continued during his membership at the Institute for Advanced Study in Princeton. He applied the semiclassical approach to finite-N matrix models and derived an integral equation for the classical eigenvalue density.

After accepting a full professorship in Hannover, Lechtenfeld focused his research to N=2 fermionic strings in 2+2 spacetime at tree and loop level. He worked out its path-integral quantization, BRST cohomology, nonlocal hidden symmetries and resulting stringy extensions of selfdual Yang–Mills theory and gravity. During the early 2000s, Lechtenfeld researched on superstring field theory, twistor string theory, topological and pure-spinor strings. He obtained exact solutions to Berkovits' string field theory and combined the Lorentz invariant N=2 string field theory with the twistor description of selfdual Yang–Mills theory.

Between 2007 and 2014, Lechtenfeld investigated heterotic string compactifications with fluxes and fermionic condensates on nearly Kähler, G2 and Sasakian manifolds, to order α', finding families of non-supersymmetric string vacua.

=== Baryon number violation, hairy black holes, Gribov problem ===
In 1990, Lechtenfeld authored an article studying baryon number violation in the Standard Model at high temperature. His research indicated a negligible baryon number violation in high energy scattering.

Between 1992 and 1996, Lechtenfeld occasionally worked on black holes with minimally coupled scalar hair in two and four dimensions. He constructed a partially analytic and a fully analytic solution representing deformations of the Schwarzschild black hole by a self-interacting scalar field; albeit violating the dominant energy condition. He also developed in general the linear perturbation theory for the stability of such backgrounds.

In 2013, Lechtenfeld found an explicit form for the Jacobian of arbitrary field-dependent BRST transformations in Yang–Mills theory. He showed that such transformations amount to a change of gauge and presented a formula for the BRST transformation producing any desired gauging. In an application to the Gribov copy problem, the Gribov–Zwanziger model was generalized beyond the Landau gauge.

=== Noncommutative field theory ===
From 2001, Lechtenfeld conducted a decade-long analysis of Moyal-deformed field theories, with emphasis on its classical solutions such as noncommutative solitons, waves, vortices, baby Skyrmions, monopoles and instantons. In particular, the construction of multi-solitons in Ward's modified sigma model and in the sine-Gordon model demonstrated the compatibility of Moyal deformations and integrability. Lechtenfeld extended the analysis to supersymmetric models with non-anticommutative solitons and to the moduli-space (or adiabatic) dynamics of Moyal-deformed abelian sigma-model solitons. He adapted the dressing, splitting and ADHM approaches to constructing noncommutative instantons and solved the Riemann–Hilbert problem for Moyal-deformed Wu–Yang, Dirac and BPS monopoles.

=== Integrable many-body systems ===
In 2003, Lechtenfeld started a new research line with extended supersymmetric mechanics and integrable many-body systems of Calogero–Moser type. He related N=4 superconformal multi-particle quantum mechanics to the celebrated WDVV equations and constructed a variety of novel models with D(2,1;α) superconformal invariance, some with extra spin variables. He reduced integrable superconformal mechanics to its angular sector and found the hidden symmetries and conserved charges of the latter. For the quantum angular Calogero–Moser models Lechtenfeld calculated the energy spectra and eigenstates, the conserved charges and intertwiners, and the admissible PT deformations. For the rational and trigonometric models he also described the algebra of the conserved charges and revealed a nonlinear supersymmetry for integral couplings.

In 2017 he proposed a curved-space generalization of the WDVV equations and the related N=4 supersymmetric mechanics. In 2018, Lechtenfeld formulated Calogero–Moser models with an arbitrary number of supersymmetries by increasing the number of fermionic degrees of freedom to the square of the bosonic ones.

=== Yang–Mills fields in higher dimensions and electromagnetic knots ===
In 2006 Lechtenfeld began investigating the equivariant coset-space dimensional reduction of Yang–Mills theories, which led to new types of quiver gauge theory and its vortex solutions. He constructed instanton solutions on coset manifolds and cones thereover with special holonomy and extended them to flux vacua of the heterotic string.

After 2014 adiabatic limits of Yang–Mills theory on warped product spaces became a subject of Lechtenfeld's research. He showed that in certain infrared limits the moduli-space approximation leads to Skyrme or Faddeev or even superstring sigma models.

In 2017, Lechtenfeld reconstructed exact finite-action Yang–Mills solutions on four-dimensional de Sitter and anti de Sitter spaces by reducing the problem to the Newtonian mechanics of a particle moving in R^3 subject to a quartic potential. The discovery of Abelian configurations led Lechtenfeld to a novel construction method for all rational vacuum Maxwell solutions (so-called electromagnetic knots) in Minkowski space, which exploits a hidden O(4) symmetry.

== Selected articles ==
- Alan Kostelecký, V.; Lechtenfeld, Olaf; Lerche, Wolfgang; Samuel, Stuart; Watamura, Satoshi (1987). "Conformal techniques, bosonization and tree-level string amplitudes". Nuclear Physics B. 288. Elsevier BV: 173–232. Bibcode:1987NuPhB.288..173A. doi:10.1016/0550-3213(87)90213-6. ISSN 0550-3213.
- Lechtenfeld, Olaf; Popov, Alexander D (18 November 2001). "Noncommutative multi-solitons in 2+1 dimensions". Journal of High Energy Physics. 2001 (11): 040. arXiv:hep-th/0106213. Bibcode:2001JHEP...11..040L. doi:10.1088/1126-6708/2001/11/040. ISSN 1029-8479. S2CID 15514770.
- Fedoruk, Sergey; Ivanov, Evgeny; Lechtenfeld, Olaf (13 April 2012). "Superconformal mechanics". Journal of Physics A: Mathematical and Theoretical. 45 (17) 173001. IOP Publishing. arXiv:1112.1947. Bibcode:2012JPhA...45q3001F. doi:10.1088/1751-8113/45/17/173001. ISSN 1751-8113. S2CID 119153414.
- Feigin, Mikhail; Lechtenfeld, Olaf; Polychronakos, Alexios P. (2013). "The quantum angular Calogero-Moser model". Journal of High Energy Physics. 2013 (7). Springer Science and Business Media LLC: 162. arXiv:1305.5841. Bibcode:2013JHEP...07..162F. doi:10.1007/jhep07(2013)162. ISSN 1029-8479. S2CID 55552279.
- Lechtenfeld, Olaf; Zhilin, Gleb (19 September 2019). "A new construction of rational electromagnetic knots". Proceedings of Corfu Summer Institute 2018 "School and Workshops on Elementary Particle Physics and Gravity" — PoS(CORFU2018). Trieste, Italy: Sissa Medialab. p. 149. arXiv:1711.11144. doi:10.22323/1.347.0149.
