= Rene Hurlemann =

German psychiatrist

Rene Hurlemann is a German psychiatrist and Full Professor of Psychiatry at the University of Oldenburg.

== Early career ==
Rene Hurlemann completed his M.D. at the University of Bonn in 2001, with a doctoral thesis on intracranial recordings in epilepsy patients. Later, he focused on stress-related emotion-memory interactions and received M.Sc. and Ph.D. degrees from Maastricht University in 2006 and 2007 respectively. In 2003 he became a resident physician at the Department of Psychiatry, University of Bonn and by 2013 became the head of the Medical Psychology Division at the same place.

== Career ==
In 2013 Rene Hurlemann became Helen C. Levitt Endowed Annual Visiting Professor at the Roy J. and Lucille A. Carver College of Medicine, University of Iowa and later on became Visiting Associate at the California Institute of Technology. In 2015 Rene Hurlemann was promoted to the Vice Chair of the Department of Psychiatry, at the University Hospital Bonn. In 2019, Rene Hurlemann became Head of the Department of Psychiatry at the University of Oldenburg. The Department of Psychiatry is part of the Karl-Jaspers-Hospital. As clinician scientist, Rene Hurlemann is committed to the field of precision psychiatry and has joined the World Psychiatric Association (WPA) section on Personalized Medicine in Psychiatry as well as the steering boards of Personalized Medicine in Psychiatry (Elsevier) and Der Nervenarzt (Springer). In addition, Rene Hurlemann serves as co-director of the International Summer School on Affective Neuroscience.

=== Research ===
Rene Hurlemann is principal investigator of the Neuromodulation of Emotion (NEMO) research program, which is focused on developing cutting-edge experimental therapies along four research trajectories: (i) Neuroimaging-based predictive biotyping, (ii) neuromodulation (via hormonal, pharmacological and brain stimulation methods) and (iii) digital and deep immune phenotyping. A particular focus of Rene Hurlemann's research agenda is transcranial magnetic stimulation (TMS).

In 2012 Rene Hurlemann had published a study in The Journal of Neuroscience which explains why oxytocin is important for flirting couples. In 2015 Dr. Hurlemann spoke to the daily newspaper General-Anzeiger about phobias, particularly vertigo.

In 2017 he had partnered with researchers from Laureate Institute for Brain Research in Tulsa, Oklahoma and the University of Lübeck to conduct a study on oxytocin and how it reduces xenophobia. In his study, while it does decrease xenophobia, it does leads to monogamy as was proven by him and Dirk Scheele who published the work in the Proceedings of the National Academy of Sciences.

The same year, Hurlemann published research showing that oxytocin combined with a prominent social norm, could lead to increased acceptance of migrants. Hurlemann sees his findings as indicative that a greater focus on positive social encounters could combat xenophobia. He also held an evening on depression along with Drs. Wolfgang Maier and Dieter Schoepf.
