= Albert Mooren =

German ophthalmologist (1828–1899)

Albert Mooren (26 July 1828 in Oedt – 31 December 1899 in Düsseldorf) was a German ophthalmologist. He studied medicine at the universities of Bonn and Berlin, where he came under the influence of ophthalmologist Albrecht von Graefe.

From 1855 he was a practicing physician in his hometown of Oedt, then in 1862 was appointed head of the newly founded municipal eye clinic in Düsseldorf, a position he maintained up until 1883. During this time period, he also served as a manager at the ophthalmology institute of Liège and Limbourg (1868–78). From 1883 up until his death, he worked at his private practice in Düsseldorf.

During his career he is credited with performing more than 25,000 operations, serving a clientele that extended beyond Germany. In 1895 he was awarded with the title of professor.

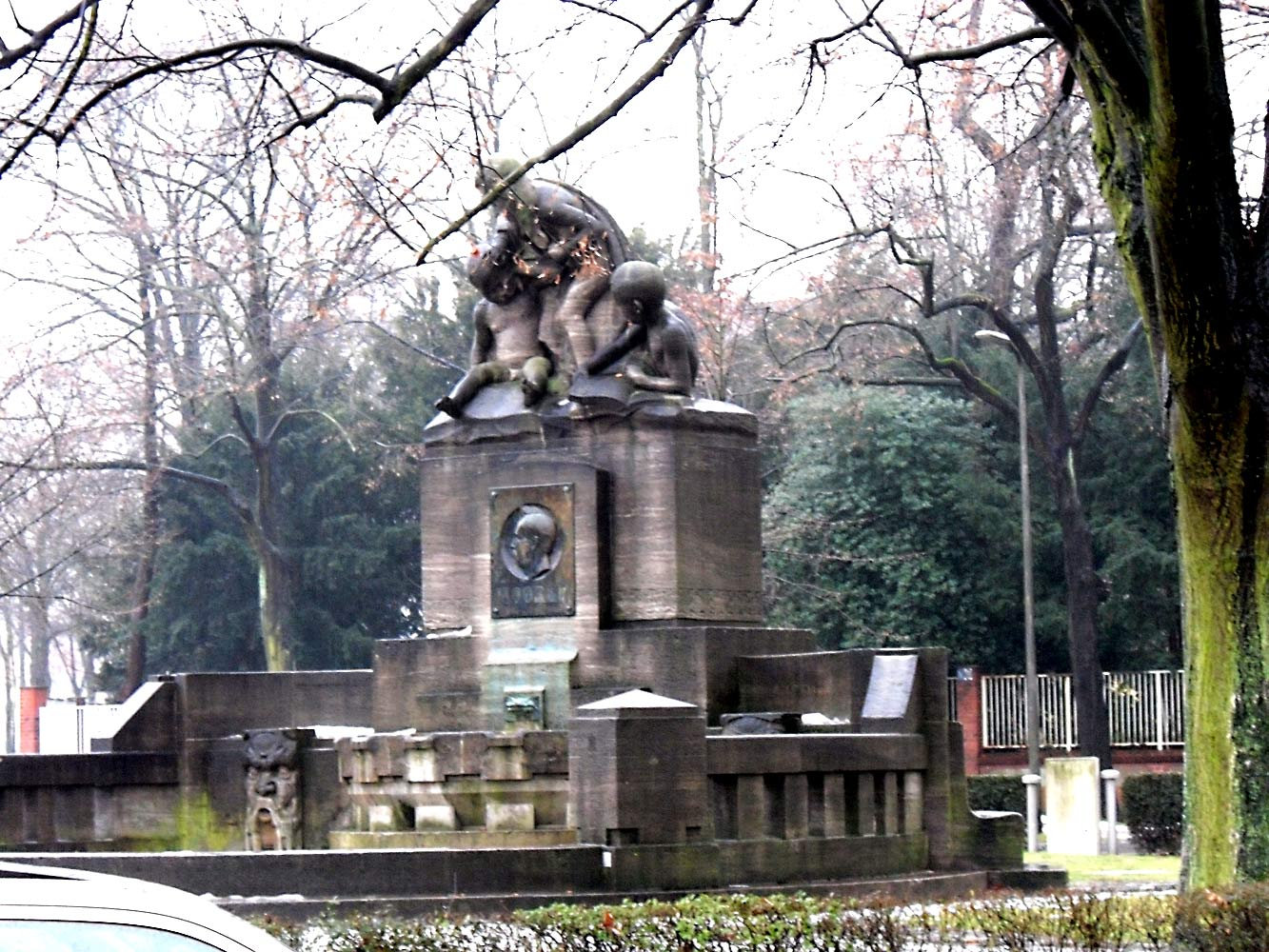
Albert Mooren Fountain in Düsseldorf-Bilk.

His name is associated with "Mooren's ulcer", a peripheral corneal ulceration that he published a number of cases about in 1863. In 1882 he was the first to describe retinitis punctata albescens.

== Selected works ==
- Ophthalmiatrische Beobachtungen, 1867 – Ophthalmological observations.
- Ueber sympathische Gesichtsstörungen, 1869 – On sympathetic vision disorders.
- Gesichtsstörungen und Uterinleiden, 1881.
- Beiträge zur klinischen und operativen Glaucombehandlung, 1881 – On clinical and operative treatment for glaucoma.
- Hauteinflüsse und Gesichtstörungen, 1884.
- Die Sehstörungen und Entschädigungsansprüche der Arbeiter, 1891 – Blurred vision and compensation claims of the worker.
- Die verminderten Gefahren einer Hornhautvereiterung : bei der Staarextraction, 1891 – The reduced risks of corneal ulceration.
- Die medicinische und operative Behandlung kurzsichtiger Störungen, 1897 – Medical and surgical treatment of nearsightedness disorders.
