= Han Young-sil =

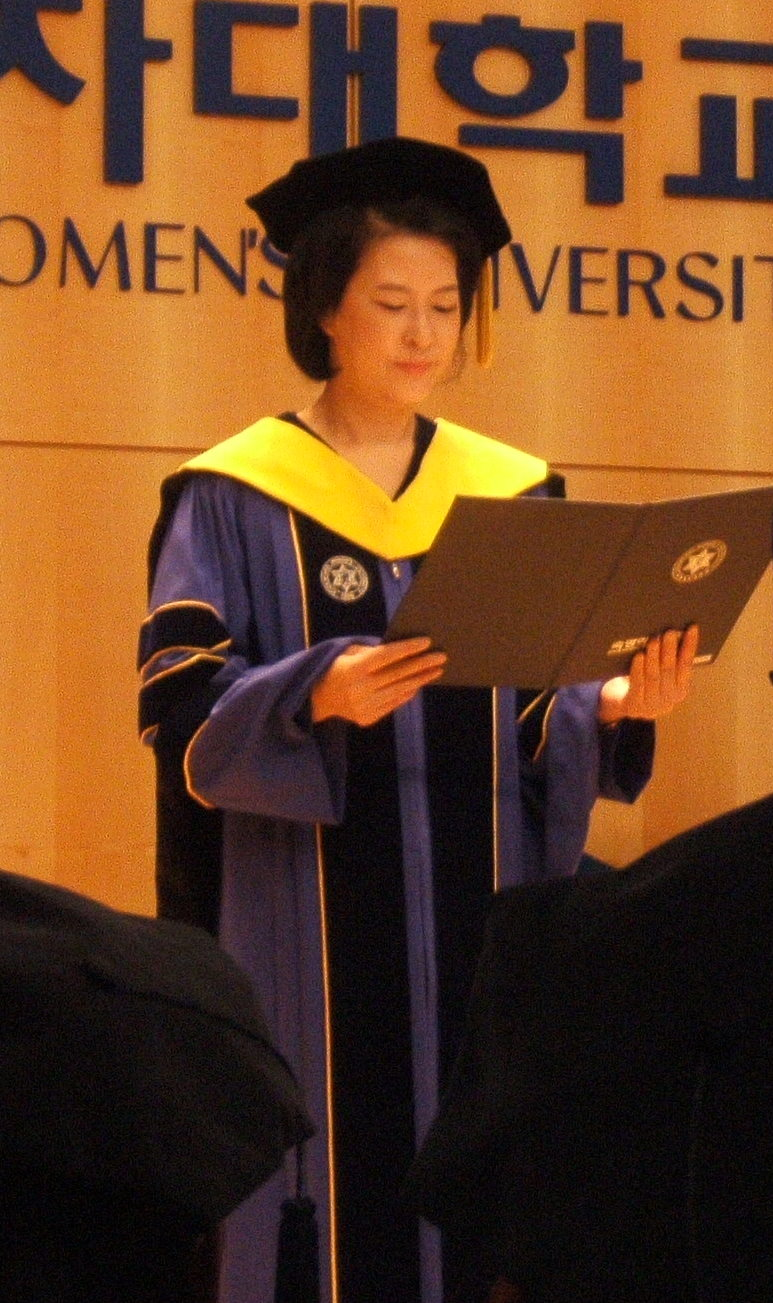
- Born: November 14, 1957 (age 68); Incheon, South Korea
- Occupations: Professor, Nutritionist

Korean name
- Hangul: 한영실
- Hanja: 韓榮實
- RR: Han Yeongsil
- MR: Han Yŏngsil

Han Young-sil (Korean: 한영실; born November 14, 1957), is a professor and nutritionist in South Korea. She was president of Sookmyung Women's University.

== Biography ==
Han Young-sil was born on November 14, 1957, in Incheon, South Korea. In 1980, she was a graduate of Sookmyung Women's University. In 1992, University of Bonn Department of Food Science training courses were completed. From 2005, she became a cast member in KBS 2TV reality show Vitamin (비타민).
