= Eva Demmerle =

German historian and writer (born 1967)

Eva Demmerle (born 18 December 1967) is a German historian and writer. She was political assistant of Otto von Habsburg.

== Life ==
Eva Demmerle studied history, political science, economy and theology at the university of Bonn and in Siegen and Paris. 1995 she became the political assistant of Otto von Habsburg during his last period as member of the European Parliament. From 1999 till his death 2011 she was head of the Habsburg office and press officer of the family. During this time she had access to the private archive of the Habsburg family and could review documents and pictures never published before. Due to her close relation with Otto von Habsburg she wrote biographies about him and his father Charles I., the last Emperor of Austria and King of Hungary. She lives and works as independent author in Feldafing in Germany.

== Books ==
- Kaiser Karl, Mythos & Wirklichkeit Amalthea Signum Verlag, 2016, ISBN 978-3-99050-044-6
- Das Haus Habsburg. HF Ullmann Verlag, Potsdam 2011 und 2014, ISBN 978-3848007233.
- Otto von Habsburg, Die Biografie. 5. Aufl., gemeinsam mit Stephan Baier, Amalthea, Wien 2007, ISBN 978-3-85002-486-0.
- Der Habsburg-Faktor: Visionen für das neue Jahrtausend. Eva Demmerle im Gespräch mit Otto von Habsburg. REDLINE, 2007, ISBN 978-3636015235.
- Kaiser Karl I. „Selig, die Frieden stiften ...“. Die Biographie. Amalthea, Wien 2004, ISBN 3-85002-521-7.
