= Erich Gerhards =

German biochemist and pharmacologist (born 1927)

Professor Erich Gerhards MD (Arzt), PhD (Dr.med.), PhD (Dr.rer.nat.)
- Born: 4 February 1927; Düren, Germany
- Died: 24 January 2017 (aged 89)
- Education: University of Bonn
- Occupations: Biochemist and pharmacologist
- Employers: Schering AG; Free University of Berlin

Erich Gerhards (4 February 1927 – 24 January 2017) was a German biochemist and pharmacologist, who was noted for his research on endocrinological topics. He was a senior researcher and head of department at Schering AG, and a professor of biochemistry at the Free University of Berlin.

== Biography ==
Gerhards was born in Düren. He studied chemistry and medicine at the University of Bonn. He earned a master's degree (Dipl. Chem.) in chemistry in 1954, passed the state exam in medicine in 1956 and earned a doctorate in medicine (Dr.med.) in the same year under the supervision of Wilhelm Dirscherl. He earned his second doctorate in chemistry (Dr.rer.nat.) in 1960 and his Habilitation in biochemistry at the University of Marburg in 1967, with the dissertation Stoffwechsel und Wirkungsmechanismus oraler Antidiabetica.

Gerhards was an assistant professor at the Institute of Physiological Chemistry at the University of Bonn from 1956 to 1960 and at the University of Marburg from 1960 to 1961. He joined Schering AG in 1961 and was director of the departments for biological chemistry (1962–1970), animal experiments in pharmacodynamics and chemotherapy (1970–1980), and pharmaceutical chemistry and pharmacodynamics (from 1980). From 1972, he was also professor of biochemistry at the Free University of Berlin.

Gerhards died on 24 January 2017, at the age of 89.
