= Joseph Schwane =

German Catholic theologian

Joseph Schwane (2 April 1824 at Dorsten in Westphalia – 6 June 1892 at Münster) was a German Catholic theologian.

== Life ==
After receiving his early education at Dorsten and Recklinghause, he studied philosophy and theology at Münster (184307), and upon his ordination to the priesthood, 29 May 1847, continued his studies for two years at the University of Bonn and University of Tübingen. He then became director of Count von Galen's institute at Münster, was privat-docent in church history, moral theology, and history of dogmatics at the University of Münster (1853-9), and assistant professor-in-ordinary of moral theology, history of dogmatics, and symbolism. At the same time he lectured on dogmatic theology along with the aged Anton Berlage, whom he succeeded as professor of dogmatic theology in 1881.

He also spent time in Rome in 1869 where he lived at the priest college Santa Maria dell' Anima.

Pope Leo XIII honoured him with the title of domestic prelate in 1890.

== Works ==
His chief work is Dogmengeschichte, the pioneer Catholic work of its kind, covering the entire history of dogmatics (4 vols., I, Münster, 1862; 2nd ed., Freiburg, 1892; II, Münster, 1869; 2nd ed., Freiburg, 1895; III, Freiburg, 1882; IV Freiburg, 1890).

His larger works in the field of moral theology are:

- Die theologische Lehre uber die Verträge mit Berücksichtigung der Civilgesetze, besonders der preussischen, allgemein deutschen und französischen (Münster, 1871; 2nd ed., 1872)
- Die Gerechtigkeit und die damit verwandten sittlichen Tugenden und Pflichten des gesellschaftlichen Lebens (Freiburg, 1873)
- Spezielle Moraltheologie (Freiburg, 1878-1885)

Smaller works are:

- Das göttliche Vorherwissen und seine neuesten Gegner (Münster, 1855)
- De controversia, quae de volore baptismi haereticorum inter S. Stephanum Papam et S. Cyprianum agitata sit, commentatio historico-dogmatica (Münster, 1860)
- De operibus supererogatoriis et consiliis evangelicis in genere (Münster, 1868)
- Die eucharistiche Opferhandlung (Freiburg, 1889)
- Uber die scientia media und ihre Verwendung fur die Lehre von der Gnade und Freiheit in Tübinger theol. Quartalschrift, XXXII (1850), 394-459,

and numerous other contributions to theological journals.
