= Bernhard Mann =

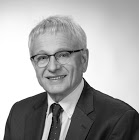
Bernhard Mann

Bernhard Mann (born 3 December 1950) is a social scientist and Master of Public Health, professor of social pedagogy, management and coaching at the iba Koeln – University of Cooperative Education, professor emeritus of health and social management at the FHM Bielefeld – University of Applied Sciences, former professor of health management and vice-president at the University of Applied Sciences Bamberg, adjunct professor of public health, social medicine and sociology at the University of Bonn, University of Koblenz-Landau, at the Berlin School of Public Health – Charité, Medical University, at several universities of educational cooperation as well as of applied sciences like in Bochum, Düsseldorf, Essen, Koeln and Wuppertal. He is public-health-coordinator of the German program at the IESS – Institut Européen des Sciences de la Santé Casablanca, Maroc.

== Education and career ==
After college education in London and Paris and the university-entrance diploma in Stuttgart, Bernhard Mann studied political economics, law, sociology, medical sociology and social policy at the University of Erlangen-Nürnberg and the University of Göttingen between 1971 and 1977. Mann acquired a master's degree in social sciences (M.A.). He could continue his research for PhD in social gerontology and social planning at the University of Kassel, his research for a MPH in public health at Hannover Medical School and his advanced training in total quality management at the Kaiserslautern University of Technology.

Bernhard Mann acted as an assistant professor of sociology at the faculty of economics and social sciences of the University of Erlangen–Nuremberg (1978–81) and at the faculty of social sciences of the University of Konstanz (1991–96), assistant professor of sociology and public health at the faculties of medicine and philosophy of the University of Bonn (1999–2011) and the faculty of educational sciences of the University of Koblence-Landau (2001–2017). Mann is an adjunct professor of public health at the FOM – University of Applied Sciences Essen (since 2013), at the iba – International University of Cooperative Education Heidelberg (since 2015) and as well as an adjunct professor of sociology at the IUBH – International University of Applied Sciences Düsseldorf (since 2017). He was a member of the scientific board of the M.A. program for Health Management in Koblence-Landau elected for certifying the Faculty of Social Sciences in Göttingen and the M.A. program for Health Management in Koblence-Landau. Together with three colleges, he is editor of the Koblence memoire for public health and health management, published by LIT (Münster-Berlin-Hamburg-London-Wien-Zürich).

== Sociological consultation ==
Bernhard Mann operated as project manager for public-health-projects for the German health ministry in the case of consulting political refugees, the German family ministry in the case of health promotion with elderly handicaps and the Bavarian social ministry in the case of the social management with elderly handicaps. He was consultant at the Germany Society for Rehabilitation and at the Institute for Vocational Training, Labour Market and Social Policy (INBAS), Offenbach am Main, is senator of the German Association of Sociologists (since 1997) and belongs to the jury in order to select the German city with the best quality of life for the elderly 2010. Mann was appointed to be an honorary judge at the administrative court in Ansbach and Köln, especially in the cases of the procedure for granting the Right of asylum. He is a member of the head of the Social Democratic Party in Unkel, a place Willy Brandt (Nobel Peace Prize 1971) settled and died (1992). Bernhard Mann is living in a house in Unkel, where Willy Brandt settled (1979–1989).

== International projects ==
Mann was funded for international studies in Japan, India, Mexico, England and France. In 1970 Mann was a selected delegate of the German youth to the World Youth Conference organized in Tokyo and Osaka / Japan under his patronage the excellence akihito. In India he held a research project in Bapagram about the Basic education by Mahatma Gandhi in comparison with the pedagogical concepts by Paulo Freire. In 1996 he was a visiting professor (German-Erasmus-Program) at the University of Edinburgh. From 2003 to 2005 Bernhard Mann was elected as adviser for the Programme national de recherche 45 – Problemes de l´Etat social, Suisse and in 2009 as adviser for Health Sociology for the European Union at the Republic of Cyprus. 2018 Mann was keynote speaker and member at the organizing committees at international congresses in Dubai, United Arab Emirates. Mann is coordinator of the German Programm of the IESS – Institut Européen des Sciences de la Santé Casablanca, Member of the Association of Schools of Public Health in the European Region (ASPHER) and Partner of the City University of New York (CUNY). Since 2008 he is listed in Marquis Who's Who in the World.

== Willy-Brandt-Forum ==
Bernhard Mann is a Politician – representative of the Social Democratic Party – and a member of the Forum in memory of Willy Brandt.

== German writer ==
The research in the view of sociology, public health, social planning and social gerontology is documented in various publications:

Basic Education by Mahatma Gandhi and Education for liberation by Paulo Freire aims to develop the whole personality. The accommodation, adequate supply and health care of political refugees needs to offer psychosocial services. The elderly entering in a retirement home needs to protect their personal and social identity and the support of elderly handicaps in a nursing home require's quality management. In the light of the increasing violence, a burden for the health as the World Health Organization reports, the development of Public Health will be a very important issue.

=== Works available in English ===
- Aging handicapped in Federal Republic of Germany (FRG): social aspects of non-integration and integration. In: E. Beregi, I.A. Gergely, K. Rajczi (Ed.) Recent advances in Aging Science II. Monduzzi Editore. Bologna 1993, ISBN 88-323-0704-9
- The Pedagogical and Political Concepts of Mahatma Gandhi and Paulo Freire. In: Claußen, Bernhard (Ed.): International Studies in Political Socialization and Education. Ed. 8. Hamburg 1996, ISBN 3-926952-97-0
- Development of Public Health in Germany. In: Journal of Community Medicine & Health Education. November 2017. Volume 7. Issue 5. ISSN 2161-0711
- (with Christiane Barbara Piel) Sociological and Public Health based help in refugees camps. In: T. Correia, V. C. da Silva (eds.) Old Tensions, Emerging paradoxes in Health: Rights, Knowledge, and Trust. 17th Biennial Conference ESHMS Lisbon 2018
- Strengthening health care by the pedagogical concepts of Mahatma Gandhi and Paulo Freire – Basic education and awareness. In: Meetings International. Emergency Medicine and Nursing Care. Journal of Nursing & Patient Care. September 2018. Volume 3. 2573–4571
- The supply of the disabled becoming elderly by the capability approach by Amartya Sen. Global Public Health Congress. In: Journal of Nutrition & Food Sciences. Oktober 2018. Volume 8. ISSN 2155-9600
- Development of Public Health in Germany and Japan: A Chance for Strengthening Democracy? In: Schmidt, Carmen and Kleinfeld, Ralf (Ed.): The Crisis of Democracy? Chances, Risks and Challenges in Japan (Asia) and Germany (Europe). Cambridge Scholars Publishing 2020, p. 443–459

=== Works available in French ===
- (avec Wolfgang Petran). The expertise of sociologists. La sociologie professionnelle en Allemagne. Sociologies d'ailleurs. Revue Sociologies pratiques. 149–159. 2010 – No 20. Presses Universitaires de France.

=== Works available in German ===
- Aging with handicaps. Public-Health-Gerontology. In: Karl, Fred, Schmitz-Scherzer, Jens (Ed.) Social Gerontology. Theory and practical knowledge. In memory of Reinhard Schmitz-Scherzer (1938–2016). LIT. Münster 2018, p. 85–107
- Health Sociology. Staatslexikon. 8th edition. Freiburg im Breisgau 2018 ISBN 978-3-451-37512-5 (E-Book) ISBN 978-3-451-81512-6
- Political Refugee. Sociological aspects and Public Health orientated recommendations in collective points. München 2007 ISBN 978-3-638-86511-1.
- Violence and Health. Public Health orientated recommendations by the World Health Organisation (WHO). In: Sozialwissenschaften und Berufspraxis 29. Jg. 1/2006. S. 81–91 ISSN 0724-3464
- Health System Research and Health Sociology. In: Health Management (Ed.): Lehrbriefe. University of Koblenz-Landau, Koblenz 2005
- Aging and Society between Competence and Ageism. In: Soziologische Revue 2/2002. S. 133–148. ISSN 0343-4109
- Ethics in Sociology. Munich 2001 ISBN (E-Book) 978-3-638-86215-8
- Health Sociology. In: University of Köln. Institute of Sociology (Ed.) Gute Gesellschaft. Münster-Hamburg-London 2000
- Home care. Effects of the Social Law. Deutsche Hochschulschriften. Bd. 509. Egelsbach-Frankfurt/Main-Washington 1994, ISBN 3-89349-509-6
- Qualities of assimilation. Elderly handicaps living in the retirement home. Frankfurt/M. 1990, ISBN 3-89228-525-X
- Adult handicaps and the old residing in an old people's home. In: Zeitschrift für Gerontopsychologie und -psychiatrie, 1, 1988/2, S. 163–172 ISSN 1011-6877
- Changing to an old people's home and basic strategies in the view of social gerontology. In: Bernhard Claußen, Karlheinz Filipp, Klaus Wasmund (Ed.): Materialien zur sozialwissenschaftlichen Forschung. Ed. 3. Frankfurt/M. 1987, ISBN 3-89228-117-3
- Political Refugee. Foreword: UNHCR (United Nations High Commissioner for Refugees). Frankfurt/M. 1983, ISBN 3-88129-725-1
- Die pädagogisch-politischen Konzeptionen Mahatma Gandhis und Paulo Freires. In: Bernhard Claußen (Ed.): Studien zur Politikdidaktik. Band 9. Frankfurt/M. 1979, ISSN 0344-3299 ISBN 3-88129-237-3

== See also ==
- List of Social Democratic Party of Germany politicians
- Gerontology
- Mahatma Gandhi
- Paulo Freire
- Public Health
- Social Medicine
- Sociology
