= Hermann Breymann =

German philologist (1842–1910)

Hermann Wilhelm Breymann (3 July 1842 – 6 September 1910) was a German philologist and pedagogue.

== Biography ==
Breymann was born in Oker, the son of a senior metalworker. He studied at University of Paris, Marburg University, and the University of Bonn. He received a doctorate in 1868 from the University of Göttingen, where he had studied under Romanist Theodor Müller. Breymann next lived in Manchester and London, first as a private tutor in Manchester, before taking the position of associate professor at Owens College.

Breymann became the joint professor for French and English at the Ludwig-Maximilians-Universität München in 1875, focusing on modern language, alongside Konrad Hofmann who focused on the older forms of both languages. In 1892, Breymann became the first Professor of Romance Philology at the Ludwig-Maximilians-Universität München. He was at the same time a member of the royal Bavarian Supreme School Council (königlich bayerischen Obersten Schulrates). In 1876, he founded the Academic New Philogogy Club (ANV, Akademisch-Neuphilologischen Verein), and would also become a Privy Councillor. He was followed in this chair by fellow Romanist Karl Vossler in 1911.

Breymann died in Bad Reichenhall on 6 September 1910. He was aged 68.

== Literary work ==
From 1890 he was editor of the Münchener Beiträge zur romanischen und englischen Philologie ("Munich contributions to Romance and English philology"). He is the author of:

- Les deux livres des Macchabées (1868) – The two books of the Maccabees.
- La dîme de pénitance : altfranzösisches Gedicht, (1874) – "La dime de penitance", an Old French poem written for the first time in 1288 by Jehan de Journi and from a manuscript of the British Museum.
- "A French grammar, based on philological principles", published in English in 1874.
- "Second French exercise book", published in English in 1875.
- Französisches Elementarbuch für Gymnasien und Progymnasien 1886 – French elementary book for high schools and secondary schools.
- Diez, sein Leben, seine Werke (1878) – Friedrich Diez, his life and works.
- Marlowe's werke, historische-kritische Ausgabe (from 1889) – Christopher Marlowe's works, historical-critical contribution (with Albrecht Wagner).
- Die neusprachliche Reform-Literatur 1876-93, (1895) – Modern language reform-literature of 1876–93.
- Die phonetische Literatur von 1876-95 (Leipzig 1897) – Phonetic literature of 1876–95.
- Die neusprachliche Reform-Literatur 1894-99, (1900) – Modern language reform-literature of 1894–99.
- Calderon Studien (1905) – Pedro Calderón de la Barca studies.
