= Günther Thomann =

German author and minister (born 1957)

Günther H. Thomann M.Th. (born 1957) is a German author, doctor and ordained minister who is living in Nürnberg, Germany.

He is the author of a large body of scholarly books, articles and essays on the subjects of Theology, Religion, Christianity, and Church History. He has assisted other scholars in producing fundamental works about New religious movements and documented the development and leading figures in minor churches such as the Lutheran John Ernest Grabe and Richard Williams Morgan, founder of the Ancient British Church. His work has been reviewed by sources such as The Journal of Ecclesiastical History, (a Cambridge University journal) and is widely cited by his peers.

== Selected bibliography ==
- 1985: Thomann, Günther, Christoph Matthäus Pfaff (1686–1760) und die Anfänge der dogmengeschichtlichen Disziplin, Blätter für württembergische Kirchengeschichte, 85, 1985, 83–133
- 1991: Thomann, Günther, Die Lehre von der Wiedergeburt bei William Law (1686–1761), Zeitschrift für Religions-und Geistesgeschichte- Journal of Religious and Intellectual History, 43,1991, 305–23
- 1992: Thomann, Günther, "John Ernest Grabe (1660–1711): Lutheran Syncretist and Patristic Scholar". Journal of Ecclesiastical History; 43, pp. 414–27, July 1992.
- 1993: Thomann, Günther, Studies in English Church History: Essays in English Liturgy and Piety from the Celtic Church to the Nonjurors, 9 November 2012.
- 1994: Thomann, Günther, The Epiclesis in the Gregorian Canon, Together with a Few Remarks on the Epiclesis in the Book of Common Prayer, Anglican Catholic Church.
- 1994: Thomann, Günther, Uniate Movements With Eastern Orthodoxy and Their Failure. Stoke-on-Trent: [no publ.]
- 1995: Thomann, Günther, The Western Rite in Orthodoxy: Union and Reunion Schemes of Western and Eastern Churches with Eastern Orthodoxy – a brief historical outline, 3rd ed., Nürnberg, private publication, pp. 51–74.
- 1995: --do.-- --do.-- d, 106 pp. Claremont, CA: Anglican Theological Seminary in California
- 1997: Thomann, Günther, The Anglican Crisis: A Brief Survey of the Origin and Development of Independent Anglican Churches.
- 1998: Thomann, Günther, The Revival of Hellenist Religion: Agrippa of Nettesheim, the Hermetic Order of the Golden Dawn and the Neo-pagan Movement.
- 2001: Thomann, Günther, A Short Biography of the Reverend Richard Williams Morgan (c:1815–1889), the Welsh poet and re-founder of the ancient British Church. An enquiry into the origins of neo-Celtic Christianity, together with a reprint of several works by Richard Williams Morgan and Jules Ferrette, etc. Pp. iii+133. Solna, Sweden: St Ephrem's Institute.
- 2013: Thomann, Günther, and Giewald, Arne: The Lutheran High Church Movement in Germany and Its Liturgical Work: An Introduction, no place of publication.

A number of articles has been published in The Oxford Dictionary of National Biography, Biographisch-Bibliographisches Kirchenlexikon, and Anglo-Orthodoxy and Church and King.
