= Hugo Miehe =

German botanist

Hugo Robert Heinrich August Miehe (12 August 1875, Braunschweig – 9 March 1932, Berlin) was a German botanist.

He studied botany at the University of Göttingen, the Ludwig-Maximilians-Universität München, and the University of Bonn, and in 1903 qualified as a lecturer of botany at Leipzig University. From 1908 to 1916, he was an associate professor at Leipzig University, during which time, he was involved in botanical research at Buitenzorg in Java (1909/10), publishing "Javanische Studien" as a result. From 1916 to 1932, he was a professor of botany at the Agricultural University of Berlin, where he was also director of the Institute of Botany and Agriculture.

== Published works ==
In 1907, he published "Die Selbsterhitzung des heus: eine biologische Studie", in which he demonstrated that the phenomenon of "self-heating hay" was due to bacterial action. The following is a list of his noteworthy written efforts:

- Die Bakterien und ihre Bedeutung im praktischen Leben, Leipzig 1907 – Bacteria and its importance in practical life.
- Die Erscheinungen des Lebens; Grundprobleme der modernen Biologie, 1907 – The phenomena of life; Basic problems of modern biology.
- Die Selbsterhitzung des heus: eine biologische Studie, Jena 1907 – The self-heating of hay: A biological study.
- Javanische Studien, Leipzig 1911 – Javanese studies.
- Zellenlehre und Anatomie der Pflanzen, Leipzig 1911 – Cytology and anatomy of plants.
- Weitere Untersuchungen über die Bakteriensymbiose bei Ardisia crispa. Jahrb. f. wissensch. Botanik, 58. Bd., 1917, p. 29 – Further investigations on bacterial symbiosis involving Ardisia crispa.
- Taschenbuch der Botanik, Leipzig (2 volumes, 1919–20) – Paperback of botany (numerous editions).
- Das Archiplasma, Betrachtungen über die Organisation des Pflanzenkörpers, 1926 – Archiplasma, reflections on the organization of the plant body.
