= Anton Berlage =

Anton Berlage (born 21 December 1805, Münster, Westphalia, now North Rhine-Westphalia - 6 December 1881, Münster) was a German Catholic dogmatic theologian.

== Life ==
He studied philosophy and theology in the same city, after completing his course at the Gymnasium, and proceeded to the University of Bonn in 1826. Esser, at the University of Münster, and especially Georg Hermes, at the University of Bonn, led him to speculations in theology. Later at the University of Tübingen, during 1829 and 1830, under Drey, J. B. Hirscher, and Johann Adam Möhler, who influenced him by their historic method.

He graduated as Doctor of Theology at the Ludwig-Maximilians-Universität München while yet a deacon, and soon after began his long career as professor in the Academy of Münster, his native town, where he taught till his death. In 1832 he was ordained priest without ever having taken a course in any ecclesiastical seminary.

== Works ==
His first book, Apologetik der Kirche, was published in 1835, and favourably noticed by Protestant critics. He was appointed, first, associate professor, then regular professor, lecturing on apologetics and moral theology, but he ultimately restricted himself to dogmatic theology.

He became dean of the faculty in 1849 and, with August Bisping, Joseph Schwane, and others, established the faculty's reputation in the field of dogma. Kuhn numbers him among those who discussed theological matters philosophically, while Knöpfler regards him as belonging to the Tübingen school.

Heinrich Brück, in his history of the Catholic Church in the nineteenth century, declares, "Berlage's writings excel in correct expression of dogmatic principles, in elegance of language, and in clearness of diction". As a lecturer he was concise and direct. He collected his studies in seven volumes, Katholische Dogmatik, published 1839-64.

== Bibliography ==
- Apologetik der kirche. Theissing. 1834.
- Einleitung in die christkatholische dogmatik. Theissingschen Buchhandlung. 1839.
- Christkatholische Dogmatik, Volumes 1-3. Theissing. 1839.
- Christkatholische Dogmatik, Volume 7. Theissing. 1864.
- Die dogmatische Lehre von den Sakramenten und letzten Dingen. Theissing. 1864.
