= Christian Patermann =

Christian Patermann (born 1942 in Gliwice, Upper Silesia) is a lawyer and is considered one of the pioneers of bioeconomics, agriculture, and foodstuffs in the European Union in Brussels.

== Life and work ==
Patermann finished his schooling in Braunschweig in West Germany in 1962. After studying private law at the University of Freiburg, the University of Lausanne, the University of Geneva, LMU Munich, and the University of Bonn, he passed his law examinations, and in 1969 he obtained a doctorate at the University of Bonn with a thesis entitled "The Development of the Principle of Free Consideration of Evidence in Ordinary Civil Proceedings in the Legislative Procedure and Case Law".

After passing his state examinations he worked from 1971 to 1996 for the Federal Ministry of Science, where he was engaged in the areas of space travel, ecology and global change. From 1998 to 1993 he was also press officer and leader of the managerial team of Federal Research Minister Heinz Riesenhuber.

From 1996 until his retirement in 2007 Patermann served in the Research Directorate of the European Union, responsible for Ecology and sustainability and as Programme Director for Biotechnology, Agriculture and Food shaped, in particular, the agricultural research framework of the EU.

=== Post-retirement ===
Since his retirement Patermann has been an advisor to numerous public and private enterprises and in 2009 was a founding member of the first German Bioökonomierat (Bio-economics Advisory Committee). In 2011 he was recognised for his service to agricultural research with the award of an Honorary Doctorate in Agricultural Science by the Agricultural Faculty of Bonn University. Christian Patermann was appointed a member of the Accademia dei Georgofili in 2012. In 2018 he was appointed Fellow of the International Society of Horticultural Societies in Leuven (Louvain), the largest international Assembly in Horticulture worldwide.
