= Friedrich Calker =

German philosopher

Friedrich Calker (July 4, 1790 – January 5, 1870), German philosopher, was educated in Jena. For a short time, he was a lecturer in Berlin. In 1818, he was called to an extraordinary professorship in the newly founded University of Bonn, becoming an ordinary professor in 1826. He substantially echoed the ideas of his teacher Jakob Fries. His two major works are Urgesetzlehre des Wahren, Guten und Schönen (The Original Teachings on the Law of the True, Good and Beautiful; Berlin 1820) und Denklehre (Logic; Bonn 1822).
