= Erich Leschke =

German internist

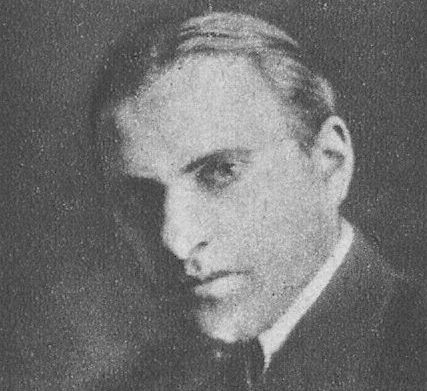
Erich Leschke

Friedrich Wilhelm Erich Leschke (23 October 1887, in Bergneustadt – 10 June 1933, in Berlin) was a German internist.

He studied medicine at the University of Bonn, receiving his doctorate in 1911 with the thesis Über die Wirkung des Pankreasextraktes auf pankreasdiabetische und auf normale Tiere ("On the effect of pancreatic extract on pancreatic-diabetic and normal animals"). He later worked at the Friedrich-Wilhelm-Stift in Bonn, at the Eppendorf Hospital in Hamburg and in the 2nd medical clinic at the Berlin Charité. In 1918 he obtained his habilitation at Berlin, where soon afterwards he became an associate professor.

His name is associated with Leschke's syndrome, a condition characterized by a combination of asthenia, multiple brown pigment spots on the skin and hyperglycemia. He described the syndrome in a 1922 paper titled Über Pigmentierung bei Funktionsstörungen der Nebenniere und des sympathischen Nervensystems bei der Recklinghausenschen Krankheit.

He was the author of numerous papers regarding cardiac, pulmonary and metabolic diseases. His book Die wichtigsten vergiftungen, Fortschritte in deren Erkennung und Behandlung was translated into English and published as Clinical toxicology; modern methods in the diagnosis and treatment of poisoning (1934).
