= List of German mathematicians =

This is a List of German mathematicians.

== A ==
- Ilka Agricola
- Rudolf Ahlswede
- Wilhelm Ahrens
- Oskar Anderson
- Karl Apfelbacher
- Philipp Apian
- Petrus Apianus
- Michael Artin
- Günter Asser
- Bruno Augenstein
- Georg Aumann

== B ==
- Isaak Bacharach
- Paul Gustav Heinrich Bachmann
- Reinhold Baer
- Christian Bär
- Wolf Barth
- Corinna Bath
- Friedrich L. Bauer
- August Beer
- Walter Benz
- Rudolf Berghammer
- Felix Bernstein
- Ludwig Berwald
- Friedrich Bessel
- Karl Bobek
- Friedrich Böhm
- Oskar Bolza
- Karl-Heinz Boseck
- Hermann Bottenbruch
- Benjamin Bramer
- Andreas Brandstädt
- Heinrich Brandt
- Richard Brauer
- Hel Braun
- Nikolas Breuckmann
- Alexander von Brill
- Adolf Ferdinand Wenceslaus Brix
- Max Brückner
- Heinrich Bruns
- Roland Bulirsch
- Johann Karl Burckhardt
- Heinrich Burkhardt
- Hans Heinrich Bürmann

== C ==
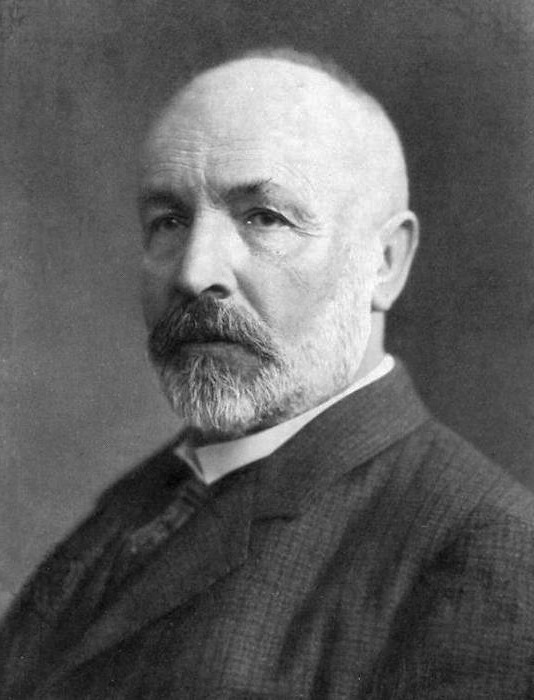
Georg Cantor

- Georg Cantor
- Constantin Carathéodory
- Wilhelm Cauer
- Ludolph van Ceulen
- Otfried Cheong
- David Christiani
- Christopher Clavius
- Stephan Cohn-Vossen
- Paul Cohn
- Armin B. Cremers
- Peter Crüger

== D ==
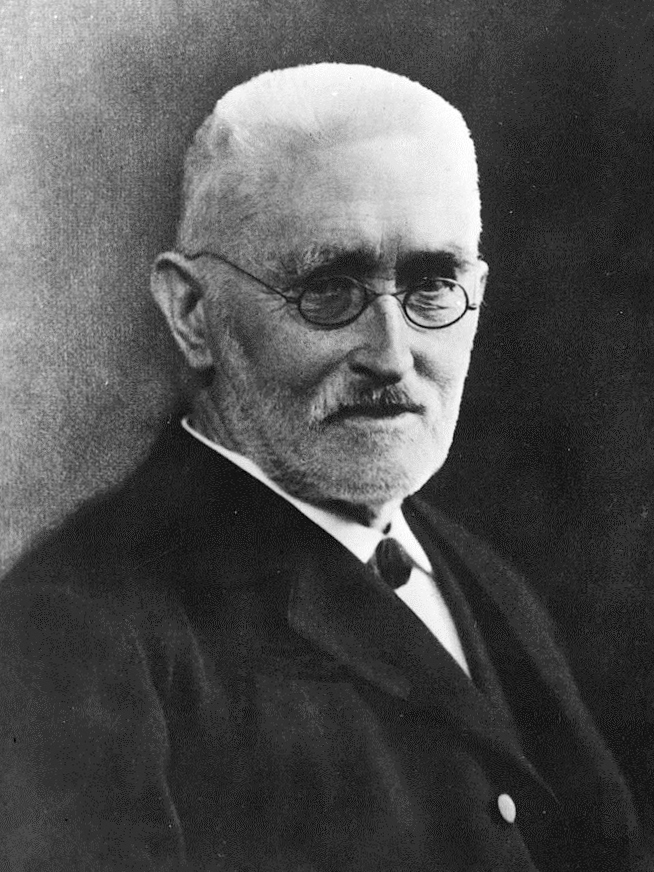
Richard Dedekind

- Richard Dedekind
- Herbert von Denffer
- Christopher Deninger
- Otto Dersch
- Max Deuring
- Anton Deusing
- Peter Gustav Lejeune Dirichlet
- Wolfgang Doeblin
- Gustav Doetsch
- Andreas Dress
- Albrecht Dürer

== E ==
- Heinz-Dieter Ebbinghaus
- Carl Gottlieb Ehler
- Martin Eichler
- Lorentz Eichstadt
- Bettina Eick
- Kirsten Eisenträger
- Joachim Engel
- Karin Erdmann
- Andreas von Ettingshausen

== F ==
- Johann Faulhaber
- Gustav Fechner
- Dmitry Feichtner-Kozlov
- Käte Fenchel
- Paul Finsler
- Felix Finster
- Bernd Fischer
- Hans Fitting
- Andreas Floer
- W. Frahm
- Wilhelm von Freeden
- Gottlob Frege
- Gerhard Frey
- Bruno von Freytag-Löringhoff
- Robert Fricke
- Robert Frucht
- Wolfgang Heinrich Johannes Fuchs
- Joseph Furttenbach
- Philipp Furtwängler

== G ==
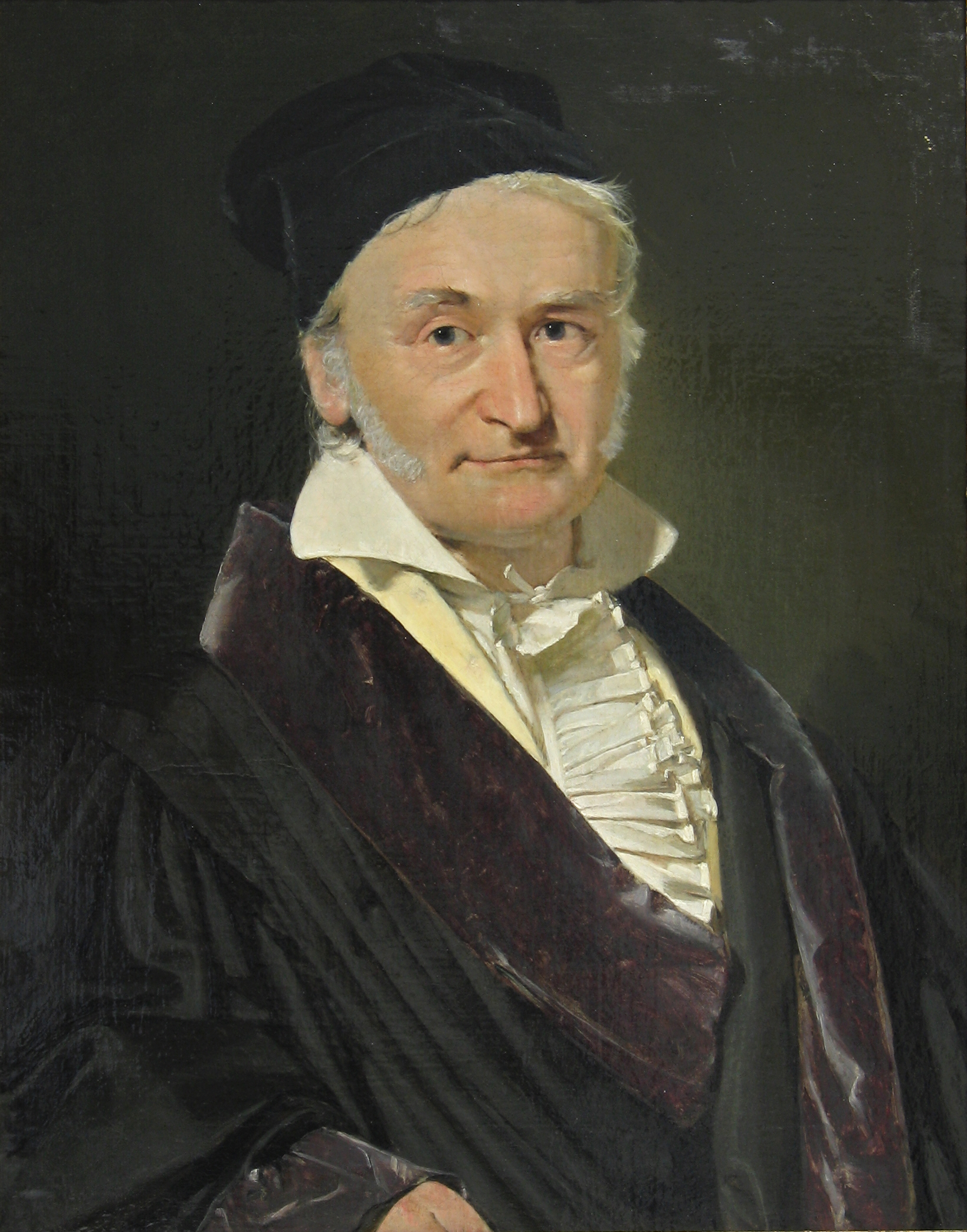
Carl Friedrich Gauss

- David Gans
- Nina Gantert
- Harald Garcke
- Joachim von zur Gathen
- Carl Friedrich Gauss
- Gerhard Geise
- Heide Gluesing-Luerssen
- Johannes von Gmunden
- Christian Goldbach
- Kurt Gödel
- Adolph Göpel
- Rudolf Gorenflo
- Lothar Göttsche
- Hermann Grassmann
- Heinrich Friedrich Gretschel
- Michael Griebel
- Martin Grötschel
- Detlef Gromoll
- Nicolas Guisnée

== H ==
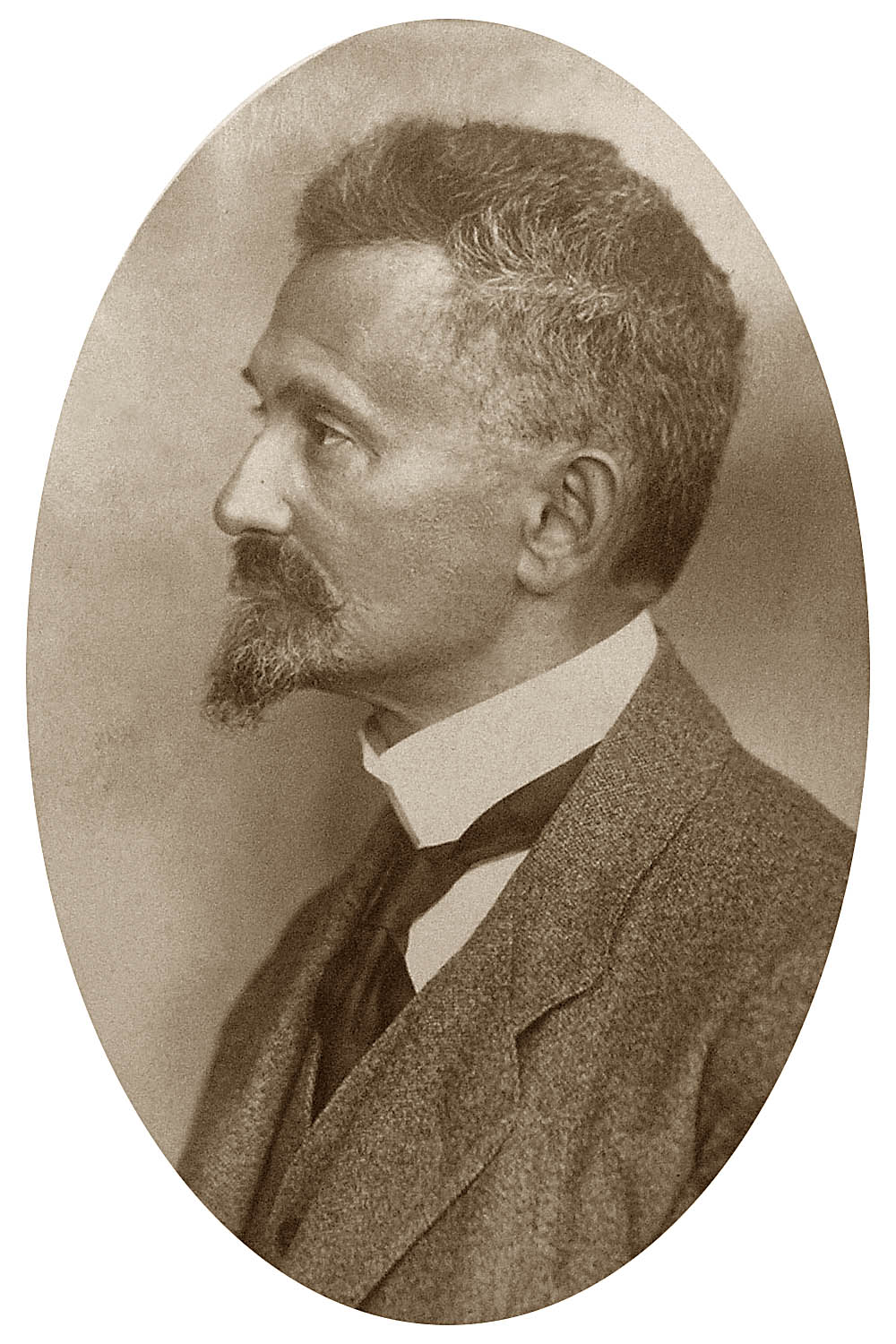
Felix Hausdorff

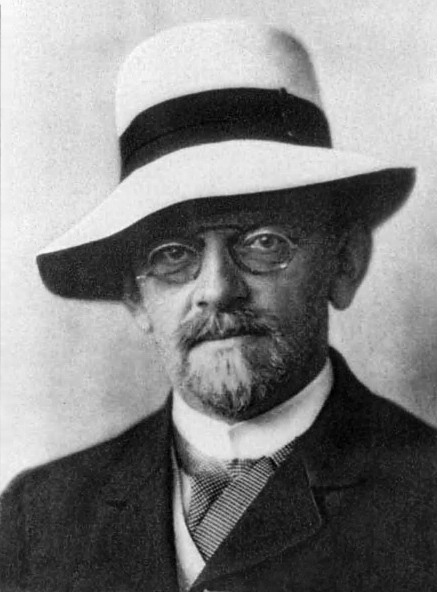
David Hilbert

- Wolfgang Hackbusch
- Arndt von Haeseler
- Elisabeth Hagemann
- Wolfgang Hahn
- Rudolf Halin
- Orit Halpern
- Ursula Hamenstädt
- Johannes Hancke
- Wolfgang Händler
- Hermann Hankel
- Raphael Levi Hannover
- Carl Gustav Axel Harnack
- Paul Harzer
- Helmut Hasse
- Maria Hasse
- Otto Hesse
- Felix Hausdorff
- Eduard Heine
- Dieter Held
- Kurt Hensel
- Ferdinand Ernst Karl Herberstein
- Maximilian Herzberger
- Edmund Hess
- Karl Hessenberg
- David Hilbert
- Friedrich Hirzebruch
- Eberhard Hopf
- Heinz Hopf
- Wolfgang Johannes Höppner
- Jakob Horn
- Günter Hotz
- Annette Huber-Klawitter
- Klaus Hulek
- Gerhard Hund
- Adolf Hurwitz

== I ==
- Ilse Ipsen
- Caspar Isenkrahe

== J ==
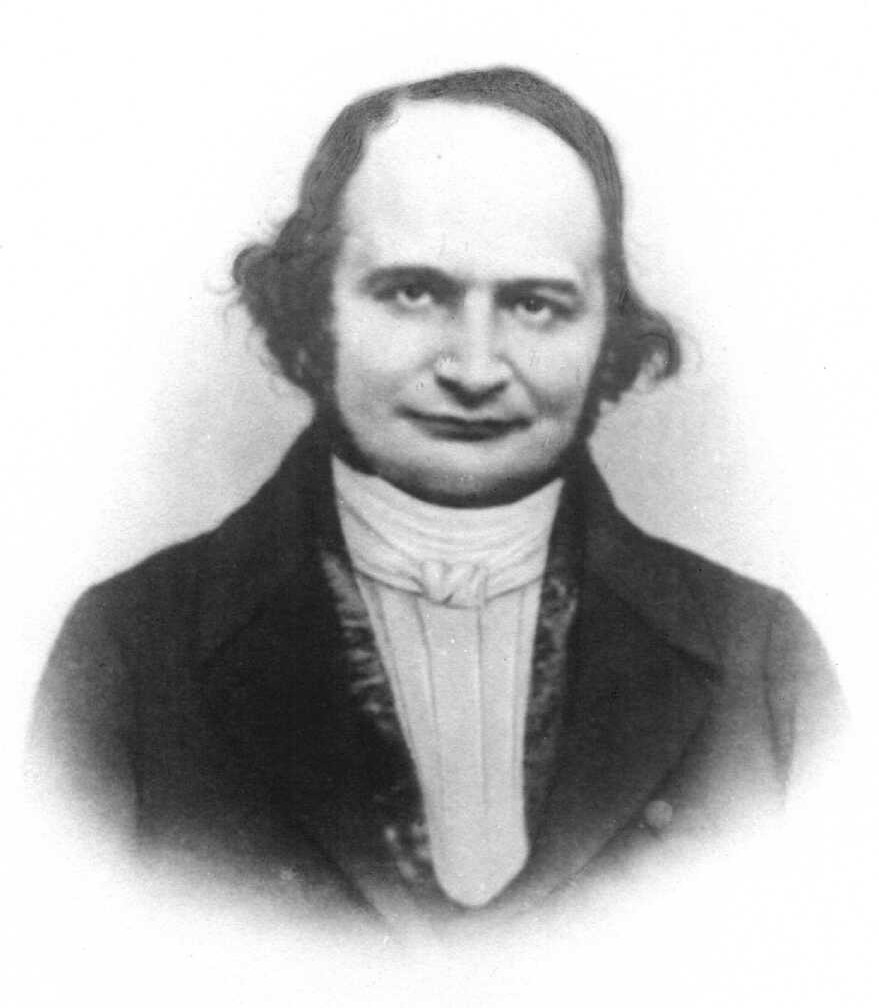
Carl Gustav Jacob Jacobi

- Carl Gustav Jacob Jacobi
- Eugen Jahnke
- Ferdinand Joachimsthal
- Philipp von Jolly
- Wilhelm Jordan
- Jürgen Jost
- Joachim Jungius

== K ==
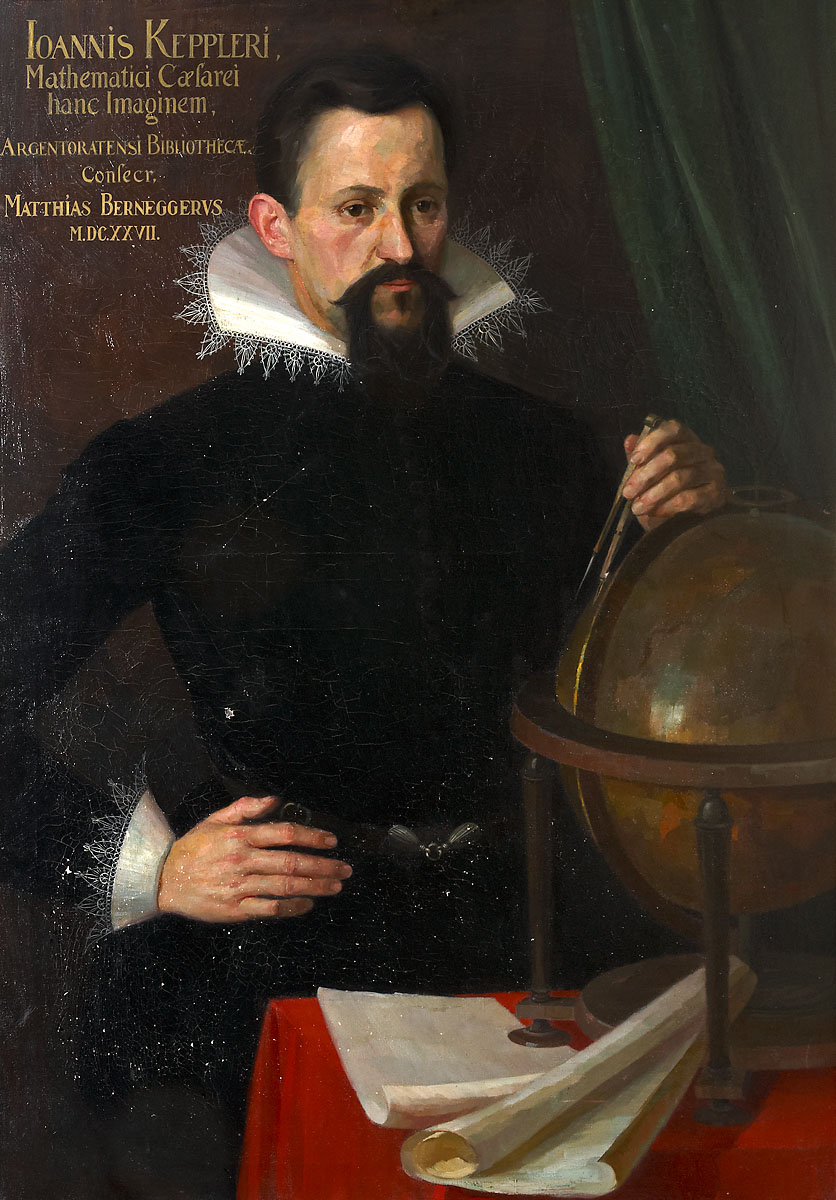
Johannes Kepler

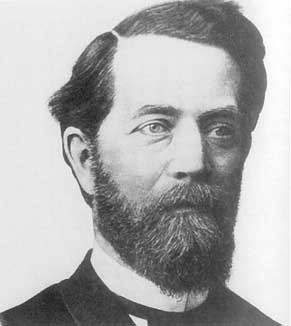
Felix Klein

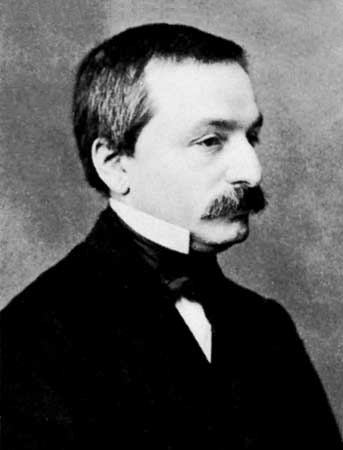
Leopold Kronecker

- Erich Kähler
- Margarete Kahn
- Gabriele Kaiser
- Theodor Kaluza
- Erich Kamke
- Ralph Kaufmann
- Julia Kempe
- Johannes Kepler
- Felix Klein
- Alfred Kneschke
- Adolf Kneser
- Hellmuth Kneser
- Martin Kneser
- Herbert Koch
- Karl-Rudolf Koch
- Rudolf Kochendörffer
- Paul Koebe
- Leo Königsberger
- Gottfried Köthe
- Ernst Kötter
- Gerhard Kowalewski
- Ludwig Kraus
- Leopold Kronecker
- Johann Heinrich Louis Krüger
- Ulrich Kulisch

== L ==
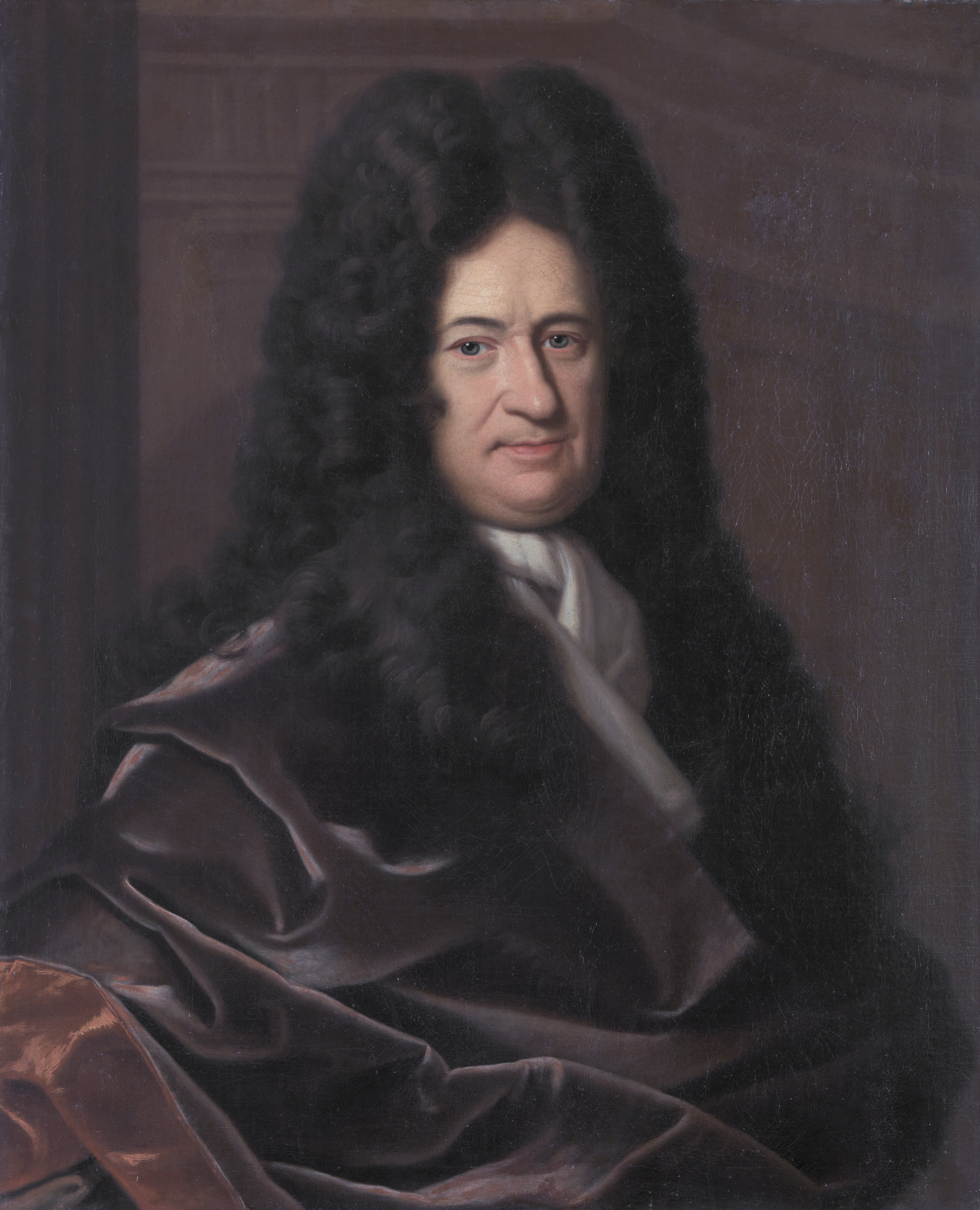
Gottfried Wilhelm Leibnitz

- Georg Landsberg
- Hans Langmaack
- Karl Christian von Langsdorf
- Johann Lantz
- Wilhelm Leber
- Gottfried Wilhelm Leibniz
- Kurt Leichtweiss
- Wolfgang Leinberer
- Thomas Lengauer
- Heinrich-Wolfgang Leopoldt
- Jacob Leupold
- Ferdinand von Lindemann
- Rudolf Lipschitz
- Peter Littelmann
- Martin Löb
- Alfred Loewy
- Paul Lorenzen
- Leopold Löwenheim
- Yuri Luchko
- Wolfgang Lück
- Stephan Luckhaus
- Günter Lumer
- Jacob Lüroth

== M ==
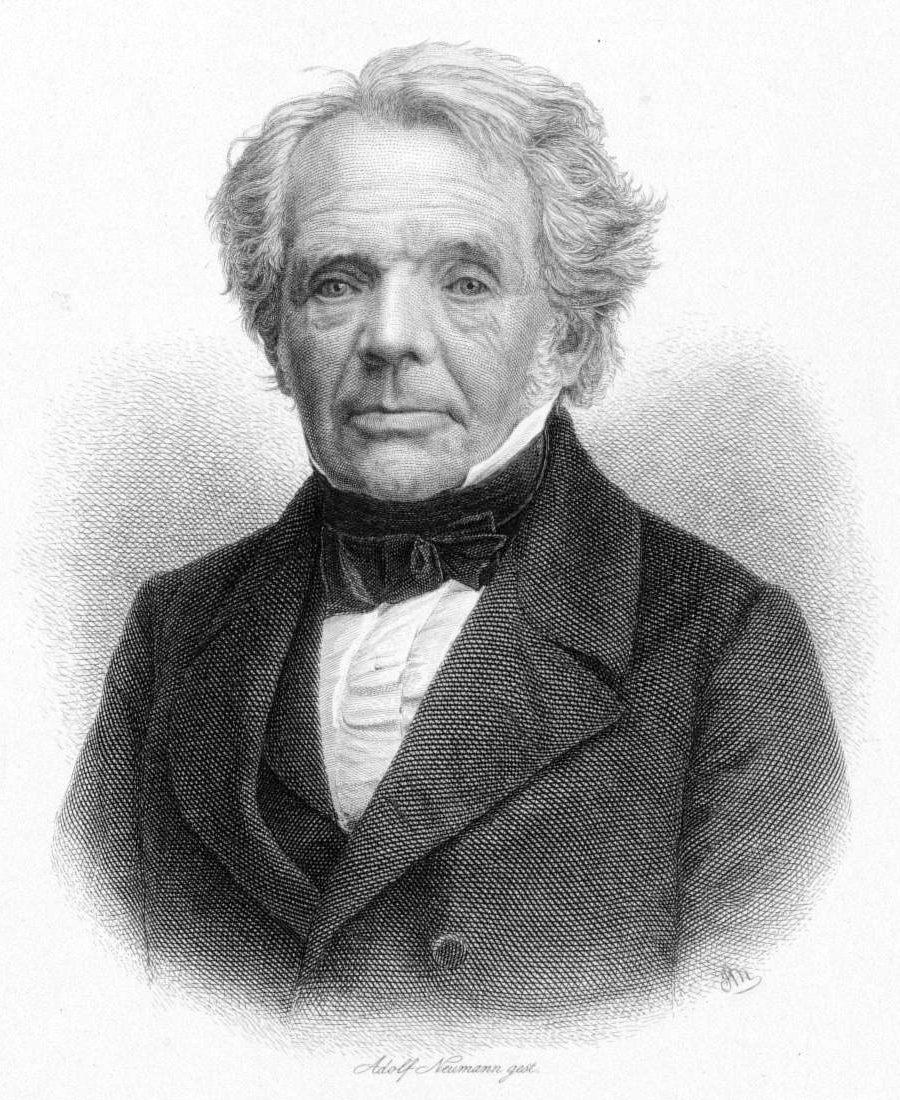
August Ferdinand Möbius

- Michael Maestlin
- Paul Mahlo
- Helmut Maier
- Hans Carl Friedrich von Mangoldt
- Yuri Manin
- Jens Marklof
- Johannes Marquart
- Karl Marx
- Christian Gustav Adolph Mayer
- Johann Tobias Mayer
- Ernst Mayr
- Gustav Ferdinand Mehler
- Ludwig Mehlhorn
- Nicholas Mercator
- Franz Mertens
- Uta Merzbach
- Richard Meyer
- Preda Mihăilescu
- Hermann Minkowski
- Otfrid Mittmann
- August Ferdinand Möbius
- Arnold Möller
- Karl Mollweide
- Robert Edouard Moritz
- Jürgen Moser
- Ruth Moufang
- John Müller
- Stefan Müller
- Werner Müller
- Herman Müntz

== N ==
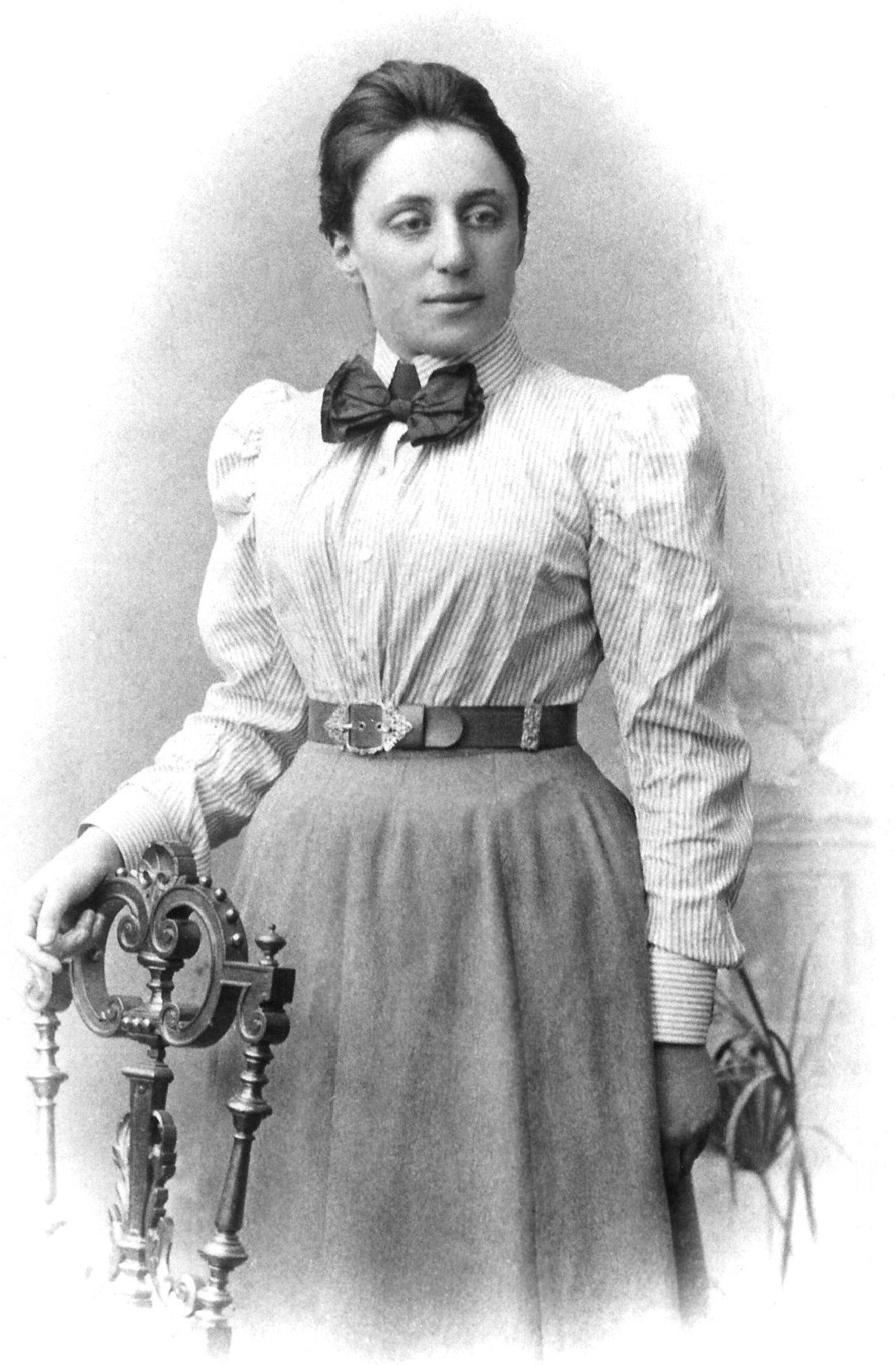
Emmy Noether

- Valentin Naboth
- Frank Natterer
- Gabriele Nebe
- Leonard Nelson
- Eugen Netto
- Jürgen Neukirch
- Carl Neumann
- Hanna Neumann
- Walter Neumann
- Mara Neusel
- Nicholas of Cusa
- Carsten Niebuhr
- Hans-Volker Niemeier
- Barbara Niethammer
- Joachim Nitsche
- Georg Nöbeling
- Emmy Noether
- Fritz Noether
- Max Noether
- Frieda Nugel

== O ==
- Adam Olearius
- Friedrich Wilhelm Opelt
- Volker Oppitz
- Claus Peter Ortlieb
- Felix Otto

== P ==
- Moritz Pasch
- Heinz-Otto Peitgen
- Rose Peltesohn
- Oskar Perron
- Fritz Peter
- Stefanie Petermichl
- Hans Petersson
- Carl Adam Petri
- Johann Wilhelm Andreas Pfaff
- Michael Pfannkuche
- Albrecht Pfister
- Adolf Piltz
- Julius Plücker
- Leo August Pochhammer
- Burkard Polster
- Johannes Praetorius
- William Prager
- Alfred Pringsheim
- Heinz Prüfer
- Friedrich Prym

== R ==
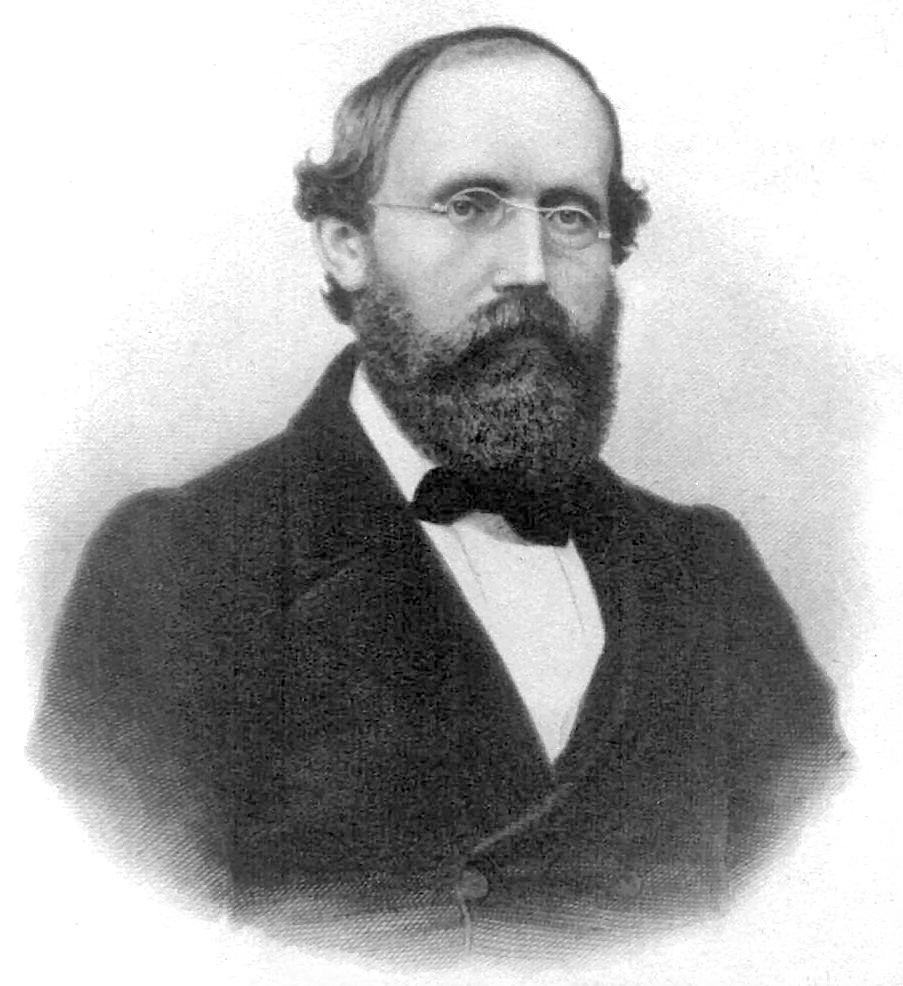
Georg Friedrich Bernhard Riemann

- Rodolphe Radau
- Thomas von Randow
- Michael Rapoport
- Regiomontanus
- Karin Reich
- Julius Reichelt
- Hermann of Reichenau
- Kurt Reidemeister
- Christian Reiher
- Nicolaus Reimers
- Erasmus Reinhold
- Michel Reiss
- Eric Reissner
- Robert Remak
- Reinhold Remmert
- Lasse Rempe-Gillen
- Theodor Reye
- Hans-Egon Richert
- Michael M. Richter
- Bernhard Riemann
- Adam Ries
- Willi Rinow
- Abraham Robinson
- Michael Röckner
- Werner Wolfgang Rogosinski
- Karl Rohn
- Helmut Röhrl
- Alex F. T. W. Rosenberg
- Johann Georg Rosenhain
- Arthur Rosenthal
- Markus Rost
- Heinrich August Rothe
- Thomas Royen
- Ferdinand Rudio
- Christoph Rudolff
- Carl David Tolmé Runge
- Iris Runge

== S ==
- Hans Samelson
- Björn Sandstede
- Lisa Sauermann
- Mathias Schacht
- Helmut H. Schaefer
- Friedrich Wilhelm Schäfke
- Paul Schatz
- Ludwig Scheeffer
- Arnd Scheel
- Georg Scheffers
- Adolf Schepp
- Heinrich Scherk
- Otto Schilling
- Victor Schlegel
- Ludwig Schlesinger
- Oscar Schlömilch
- Wilfried Schmid
- Friedrich Karl Schmidt
- Gunther Schmidt
- Theodor Schneider
- Claus P. Schnorr
- Eckehard Schöll
- Arnold Scholz
- Heinrich Scholz
- Peter Scholze
- Johannes Schöner
- Arnold Schönhage
- Erich Schönhardt
- Gaspar Schott
- Martin Schottenloher
- Hieronymus Schreiber
- Ernst Schröder
- Heinrich G. F. Schröder
- Heinrich Schröter
- Karl Schröter
- Hermann Schubert
- Horst Schubert
- Johann Friedrich Schultz
- Friedrich Schur
- Issai Schur
- Edmund Schuster
- Christof Schütte
- Kurt Schütte
- Hermann Schwarz
- Daniel Schwenter
- Hans Schwerdtfeger
- Christoph Scriba
- Paul Scriptoris
- Karl Seebach
- Paul Seidel
- Philipp Ludwig von Seidel
- Wladimir Seidel
- Herbert Seifert
- Reinhard Selten
- Bernd Siebert
- Carl Ludwig Siegel
- Max Simon
- Peter Slodowy
- Hans Sommer
- Wilhelm Specht
- Emanuel Sperner
- Theodor Spieker
- Herbert Spohn
- Roland Sprague
- Ludwig Staiger
- Simon von Stampfer
- Angelika Steger
- Karl Stein
- Carl August von Steinheil
- Ernst Steinitz
- Moritz Abraham Stern
- Michael Stifel
- Johannes Stöffler
- Josef Stoer
- Uwe Storch
- Volker Strassen
- Reinhold Strassmann
- Aegidius Strauch II
- Karl Strehl
- Thomas Streicher
- Catharina Stroppel
- Michael Struwe
- Eduard Study
- Ulrich Stuhler
- Friedrich Otto Rudolf Sturm
- Johann Sturm
- Karl-Theodor Sturm
- Bernd Sturmfels
- Wilhelm Süss
- John M. Sullivan

== T ==
- Rosalind Tanner
- Georg Tannstetter
- Oswald Teichmüller
- Bernhard Friedrich Thibaut
- Carl Johannes Thomae
- Gerhard Thomsen
- William Threlfall
- Ulrike Tillmann
- Heinrich Emil Timerding
- Otto Toeplitz
- Johann Georg Tralles
- Abdias Treu
- Walter Trump
- Ehrenfried Walther von Tschirnhaus
- Reidun Twarock
- Dietrich Tzwyvel

== U ==
- Helmut Ulm

== V ==
- Theodor Vahlen
- Rüdiger Valk
- Wilhelm Vauck
- Hermann Vermeil
- Eva Viehmann
- Eckart Viehweg
- Vitello
- Kurt Vogel

== W ==
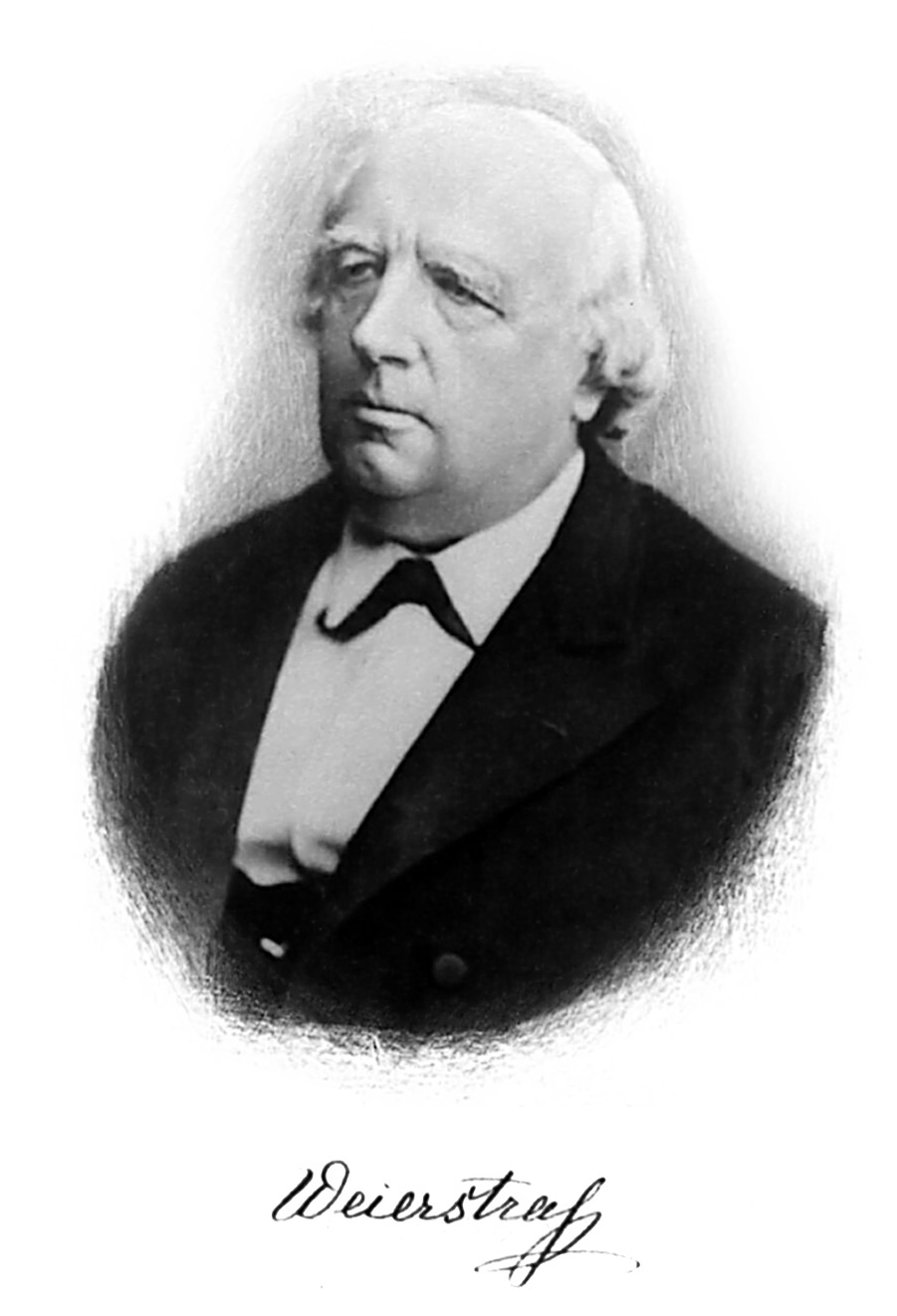
Karl Weierstrass

- Klaus Wagner
- Manfred Wagner
- Friedhelm Waldhausen
- Marion Walter
- Friedrich Heinrich Albert Wangerin
- Eduard Ritter von Weber
- Heinrich Martin Weber
- Werner Weber
- Katrin Wehrheim
- Dieter Weichert
- Joachim Weickert
- Karl Weierstrass
- Erhard Weigel
- Julius Weingarten
- Michael Weiss
- Paul Weiss
- Ernst August Weiß
- Katrin Wendland
- Elisabeth M. Werner
- Johannes Werner
- Hermann Weyl
- Johannes Widmann
- Arthur Wieferich
- Helmut Wielandt
- Anna Wienhard
- Hermann Wilken
- Rudolf Wille
- Thomas Willwacher
- Ernst Eduard Wiltheiss
- Ernst Witt
- Alexander Witting
- Franz Woepcke
- Barbara Wohlmuth
- Paul Wolfskehl
- Hans Wussing
- Peter Wynn

== Z ==
- Hans Zassenhaus
- Julius August Christoph Zech
- Christian Zeller
- Karl Longin Zeller
- Christoph Zenger
- Sarah Zerbes
- Ernst Zermelo
- Karl Eduard Zetzsche
- Günter M. Ziegler
- Heiner Zieschang
- Johann Jacob Zimmermann
- Thomas Zink
- Benedict Zuckermann

== See also ==
- List of mathematicians
- Science and technology in Germany
