= Dersch =

Dersch is a surname. Notable people with the surname include:

- Doug Dersch (born 1946), Canadian football player
- Hans Dersch (born 1967), American swimmer
- Otto Dersch, German mathematician

== See also ==
- R v Dersch, Canadian court case
