= Zetzsche =

Zetzsche is a German surname. Notable people with the surname include:

- Jost Oliver Zetzsche, German translator
- Karl Eduard Zetzsche, German mathematician
- Manfred Zetzsche, German actor
- Mónica Zetzsche, Argentinian woman, former President of the YWCA
