= John Muller (disambiguation) =

John Muller (born 1966) is an American television journalist.

John Muller may also refer to:

- John Müller (1699–1784), German mathematician and engineer
- John Muller (cricketer) (1933–2014), South African cricketer
- John Stewart Muller, American film director

== See also ==
- John Mueller (born 1937), American political scientist
- John Howard Mueller (1891–1954), American biochemist, pathologist, and bacteriologist
