= Kamke =

Kamke is a surname. Notable people with the surname include:

- Erich Kamke (1890–1961), German mathematician
- Tobias Kamke (born 1986), German tennis player
