= Schepp =

Schepp is a surname. Notable people with the surname include:

- Adolf Schepp (1837–1905), German mathematician
- Auguste Schepp (1846–1905), German painter
- Emelie Schepp (born 1979), Swedish crime author
- Guste Schepp (1886-1967), German politician and women's rights activist
