= Hans Wilhelm Alt =

German mathematician (born 1945)

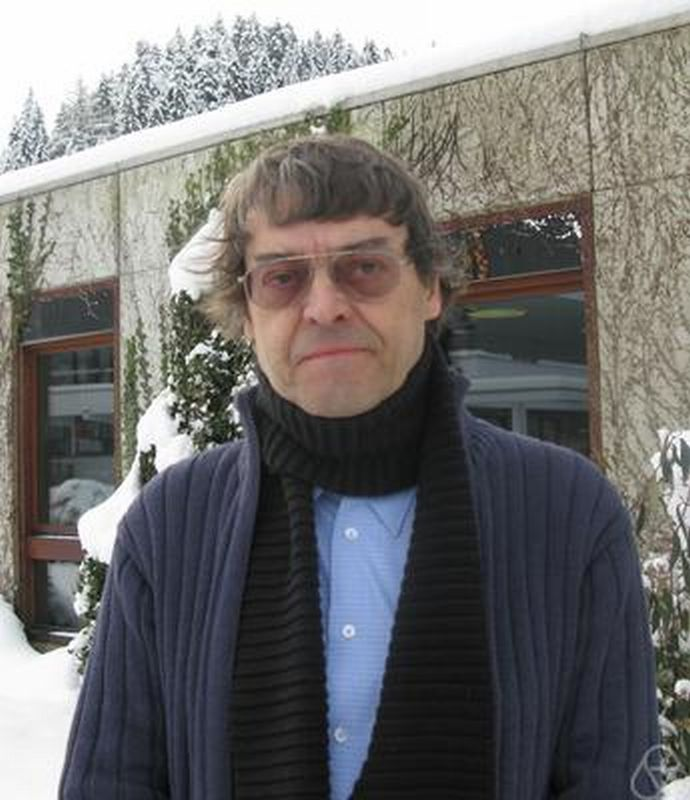
Alt at Oberwolfach, 2010

Hans Wilhelm Alt (born 1945, Hilden) is a German mathematician, specializing in partial differential equations and their applications.

Alt received his Abitur in 1965 from the prestigious secondary school Helmholtz-Gymnasium Hilden. In 1971 he received his PhD from the Georg-August-Universität Göttingen under Erhard Heinz with thesis Verzweigungspunkte von H-Flächen (Branching points of H-surfaces.) Alt became a professor at the Institute for Applied Mathematics at the University of Bonn, where he retired as professor emeritus in 2010. In 2011 he was made an honorary professor at the Technical University of Munich.

His research deals with, among other topics, free boundary value problems for elliptic partial differential equations and hyperbolic partial differential equations with applications to mechanics and thermodynamics. For example, he has done research on axially symmetric jet flows and propagation of fluids in inhomogeneous porous media. More recently, he has studied the mathematical theory of phase transitions.

in 1986 Alt was an Invited Speaker of the ICM in Berkeley, California. He is the author of a textbook on functional analysis, which has been translated into English.

His doctoral students include Harald Garcke and Barbara Niethammer. His brother is the biomathematician Wolfgang Alt.

== Selected publications ==
- Alt, Hans Wilhelm (2012). Lineare Funktionalanalysis (6th ed.). Springer Verlag. doi:10.1007/978-3-642-22261-0. ISBN 978-3-642-22260-3.
- Alt, Hans Wilhelm (2016). Linear Functional Analysis (1st ed.). Springer London. doi:10.1007/978-1-4471-7280-2.
- with Luis Caffarelli and Avner Friedman: Alt, H. W.; Caffarelli, L. A.; Friedman, A. (1983). "Axially symmetric jet flows". Archive for Rational Mechanics and Analysis. 81 (2): 97–149. Bibcode:1983ArRMA..81...97A. doi:10.1007/BF00250648. S2CID 120248945.
- with Stephan Luckhaus: Wilhelm Alt, Hans; Luckhaus, Stephan (1983). "Quasilinear elliptic-parabolic differential equations". Mathematische Zeitschrift. 183 (3): 311–341. doi:10.1007/BF01176474. S2CID 120607569.
- with L. Caffarelli and A. Friedman: "A free boundary problem for quasi-linear elliptic equations". Annali della Scuola Normale Superiore di Pisa - Classe di Scienze. 11 (1): 1–44. 1984.
- with L. Caffarelli and A. Friedman: Alt, Hans Wilhelm; Caffarelli, Luis A.; Friedman, Avner (1984). "Variational problems with two phases and their free boundaries". Transactions of the American Mathematical Society. 282 (2): 431–461. doi:10.1090/S0002-9947-1984-0732100-6.

== See also ==
- Richards equation
