= Richard Ernst =

Richard Ernst may refer to:

- Richard R. Ernst (1933–2021), Swiss physical chemist and Nobel Laureate
- Richard P. Ernst (1858–1934), U.S. Senator from Kentucky

== See also ==
- Richard Ernst Meyer, mathematician and engineer
