= Numerische Mathematik =

- Discipline: Numerical analysis
- Language: English
- Edited by: Franco Brezzi, Tony F. Chan, Michael Griebel

Publication details
- History: 1959–present
- Publisher: Springer Science+Business Media
- Frequency: Monthly
- Impact factor: 2.223 (2020)

Standard abbreviations
- ISO 4: Numer. Math.

Indexing
- CODEN: NUMMA7
- ISSN: 0029-599X (print); 0945-3245 (web)
- LCCN: 64000635
- OCLC no.: 1760917

Links
- Journal homepage

Numerische Mathematik is a peer-reviewed mathematics journal on numerical analysis. It was established in 1959 and is published by Springer Science+Business Media. The journal is indexed by Mathematical Reviews and Zentralblatt MATH. Its 2009 MCQ was 1.06, and its 2020 impact factor was 2.223.
