= Bobek =

Bobek is a surname. Notable people with the surname include:

- Filip Bobek (born 1980), Polish actor
- Gaspard Bobek (1593–1635), Croatian bishop
- Hans Bobek (1903−1990), Austrian geographer
- Karl Bobek (1855–1899), German mathematician
- Michal Bobek (born 1977), Czech judge and legal scholar
- Miroslav Bobek (born 1967), Czech natural scientist
- Nicole Bobek (born 1977), retired American figure skater
- Pavel Bobek (1937–2013), Czech singer
- Stjepan Bobek (1923−2010), Croatian football striker and manager

Also diminutive of name Robert:

- Robert Lewandowski (born 1988), Polish footballer
