= Max Simon (disambiguation) =

Max Simon (1899–1961) was a German SS-Gruppenführer and lieutenant General of the Waffen-SS.

Max Simon may also refer to:

- Max Simon (mathematician) (1844–1918), German mathematician and historian of mathematics
- Max Simon Ehrlich (1909–1983), American writer
- Max Simon Nordau (1849–1923), Zionist leader, physician, and author

== See also ==
- Simon-Max (1852–1923), French tenor
- Max Simeoni
