= Otto calculus =

Mathematical system for studying diffusion equations

The Otto calculus (also known as Otto's calculus) is a mathematical system for studying diffusion equations that views the space of probability measures as an infinite dimensional Riemannian manifold by interpreting the Wasserstein distance as if it were a Riemannian metric.

It is named after Felix Otto, who developed it in the late 1990s and published it in a 2001 paper on the geometry of dissipative evolution equations. Otto acknowledges inspiration from earlier work by David Kinderlehrer and conversations with Robert McCann and Cédric Villani.

== See also ==
- Itô calculus
