= Max Planck Institute for Mathematics in the Sciences =

Research institute

Coordinates: 51°20′29″N 12°23′29″E

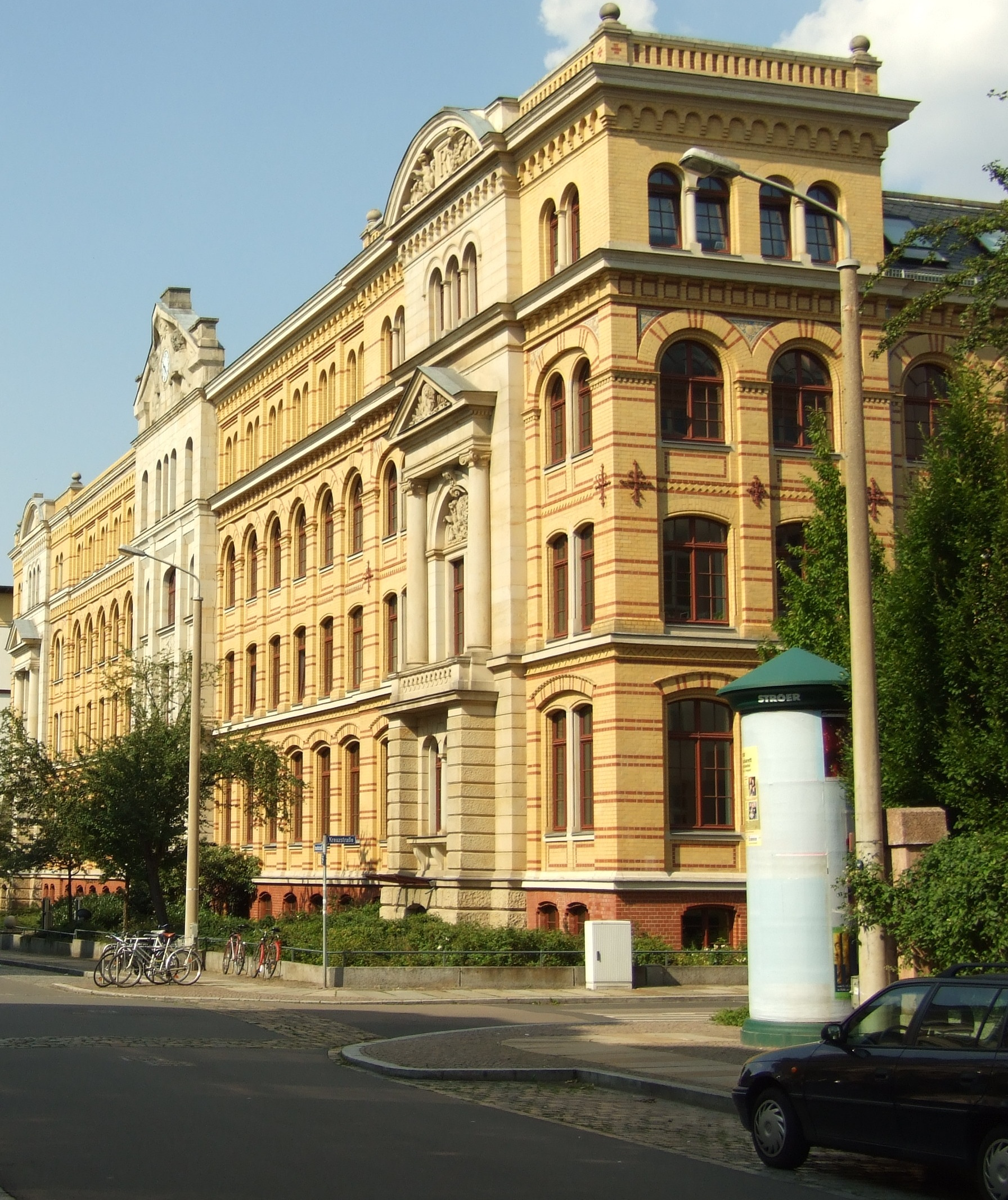
The building that hosts the MPI MiS

The Max Planck Institute for Mathematics in the Sciences (MPI MiS) in Leipzig is a research institute of the Max Planck Society. Founded on March 1, 1996, the institute works on projects which apply mathematics in various areas of natural sciences, in particular physics, biology, chemistry and material science.

== Research groups ==
- Geometry and complex systems (Jürgen Jost)
- Pattern formation, energy landscapes and scaling laws (Felix Otto)
- Nonlinear algebra (Bernd Sturmfels)
- Applied analysis (László Székelyhidi)
- Geometry, groups and dynamics (Anna Wienhard)
- Discrete sets in geometry (Samantha Fairchild)
- Geometry on surfaces (James Reed Farre)
- Stochastic partial differential equations (Benjamin Gess)
- Mathematical software (Michael Joswig)
- Mathematical machine learning (Guido Montúfar)
- Learning and inference (Sayan Mukherjee)
- Interdisciplinary frontiers of algebraic geometry (İrem Portakal)
- Probability and variational methods in PDEs (Tobias Ried)
- Mathematical structures in physics (Daniel Roggenkamp)
- Stochastic topology and its applications (Érika Roldán)
- Numerical nonlinear algebra (Simon Telen)

The institute has an extensive visitors programme which has made Leipzig a main place for research in applied mathematics.

The MPI MiS is a member of ERCOM (European Research Centres in Mathematics).
