= Hans Werner Ballmann =

German mathematician

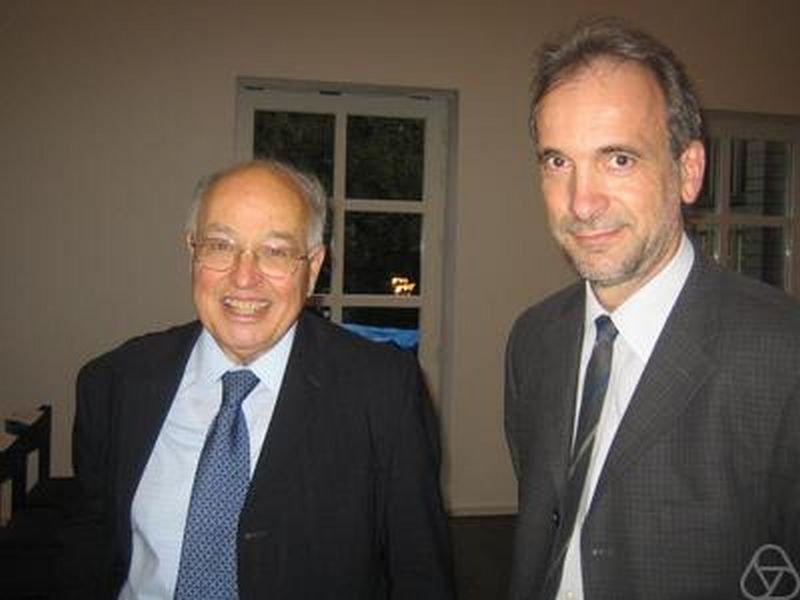
Michael Atiyah (left) and Ballmann (right), 2007

Hans Werner Ballmann (known as Werner Ballmann; born 11 April 1951) is a German mathematician. His area of research is differential geometry with focus on geodesic flows, spaces of negative curvature as well as spectral theory of Dirac operators

Ballmann earned his doctorate from the University of Bonn in 1979, under the supervision of Wilhelm Klingenberg. He was a professor at the University of Bonn, and a director of the Max Planck Institute for Mathematics in Bonn, Germany, from 2007 to 2019. He has advised 16 doctoral students at Bonn, including Christian Bär and Anna Wienhard.

He is a member of the German Academy of Sciences Leopoldina since 2007, and a member of the scientific committee of the Mathematical Research Institute of Oberwolfach since 2004.

== Selected works ==
- Lectures on spaces of non positive curvatures (PDF; 818 kB), DMV Seminar, Birkhäuser 1995
- Spaces of non positive curvature, Jahresbericht DMV, vol. 103, 2001, pp. 52–65
- Ballmann, Werner; Matthias, Hans-Heinrich (1978). Der Satz von Lusternik und Schnirelmann. Bonn: Mathematisches Inst. der Univ. OCLC 615032441.
- ——; Thorbergsson, Gudlaugur; Ziller, Wolfgang (1982). "Closed geodesics on positively curved manifolds". Annals of Mathematics. 116 (2): 213–247. doi:10.2307/2007062. JSTOR 2007062. MR 0672836.
- —— (1985). "Nonpositively Curved Manifolds of Higher Rank". The Annals of Mathematics. 122 (3): 597–609. doi:10.2307/1971331. ISSN 0003-486X. JSTOR 1971331.
- ——; Brin, Michael (1995). "Orbihedra of nonpositive curvature". Publications mathématiques de l'IHÉS. 82 (1): 169–209. doi:10.1007/BF02698640. ISSN 0073-8301.
- ——; Światkowski, Jacek (1997). "On $L^2$-cohomology and property (T) for automorphism groups of polyhedral cell complexes". Geometric and Functional Analysis. 7 (4): 615–645. doi:10.1007/s000390050022. MR 1465598. S2CID 15531550.
