= Wolfgang Walter =

Wolfgang Ludwig Walter
- Born: 2 May 1927; Schwäbisch Gmünd, Weimar Republic
- Died: 26 June 2010 (aged 83); Karlsruhe, Germany
- Education: University of Tübingen
- Scientific career
- Fields: Mathematics
- Workplaces: University of Karlsruhe
- Doctoral advisor: Erich Kamke, Hellmuth Kneser

Wolfgang Ludwig Walter (2 May 1927 – 26 June 2010) was a German mathematician, who specialized in the theory of differential equations. His textbook on ordinary differential equations became a standard graduate text on the subject at many institutions.

== Biography ==
Wolfgang Walter was born in 1927 in Schwäbisch Gmünd, Baden-Württemberg. His school studies were interrupted in 1943 when he was drafted into the army. He served as a soldier on the Eastern Front, was subsequently wounded and later interned as a prisoner of war by US troops. In 1946 after his release he completed his school education and in the years 1947–1952 studied mathematics and physics at the University of Tübingen, where he stayed on to study for his PhD under Erich Kamke and Hellmuth Kneser, defending his thesis in 1956. In 1986–1992 Walter held the post of president of GAMM, the German society of applied mathematics and mechanics.

He died in Karlsruhe in 2010 at the age of 83.

== Works ==
- Walter, Wolfgang (1998). Ordinary Differential Equations. Springer. ISBN 978-0387984599.
- Walter, Wolfgang (2012). Differential and Integral Inequalities. Springer; Softcover reprint of the original 1st ed. 1970 edition. ISBN 978-3642864070.
