= Felix Otto (mathematician) =

German mathematician

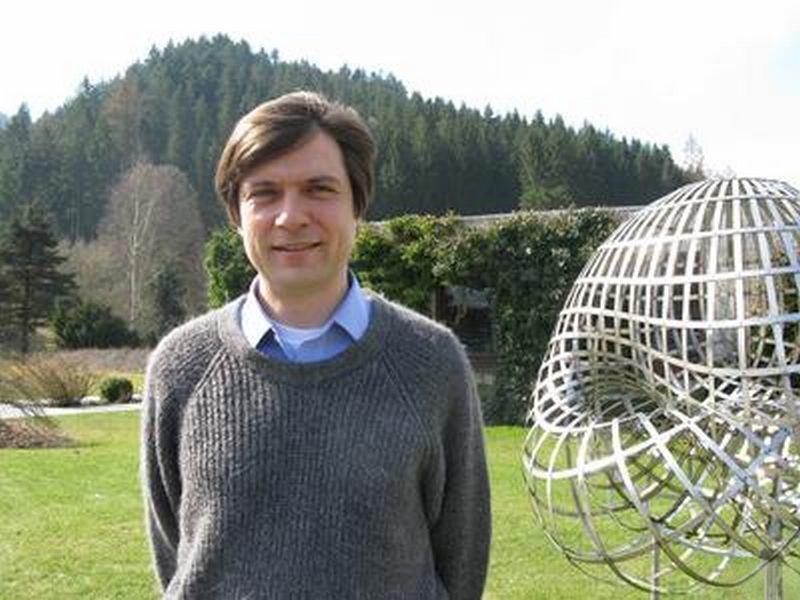
- Otto at Oberwolfach, 2009
- Born: 19 May 1966 (age 60); Munich, Bavaria, West Germany
- Known for: Otto–Villani theorem Otto calculus
- Awards: Gottfried Wilhelm Leibniz Prize 2006; Blaise Pascal Medal, European Academy of Sciences (2017)
- Scientific career
- Fields: Mathematics
- Workplaces: Max Planck Institute for Mathematics in the Sciences, University of Leipzig, New York University, Carnegie Mellon University, University of Bonn, University of California, Santa Barbara
- Doctoral advisor: Stephan Luckhaus

Felix Otto (born 19 May 1966) is a German mathematician and professor.

== Biography ==
Otto was born on 19 May 1966 in Munich, Bavaria. He studied mathematics at the University of Bonn, finishing his PhD thesis in 1993 under the supervision of Stephan Luckhaus. After postdoctoral studies at the Courant Institute of Mathematical Sciences of New York University and at Carnegie Mellon University, in 1997 he became a professor at the University of California, Santa Barbara. From 1999 to 2010 he was a professor for applied mathematics at the University of Bonn, and he currently serves as one of the directors of the Max Planck Institute for Mathematics in the Sciences in Leipzig.

== Work ==
Otto specialises in materials science, and he has worked on the theory of partial differential equations. He is especially known for his work on the Otto–Villani theorem and the invention of the Otto calculus.

== Honours ==
In 2006, he was awarded the Gottfried Wilhelm Leibniz Prize by the German Research Foundation, which is the considered the most important research award in Germany.

In 2008, he became a member of the German National Academy of Sciences Leopoldina.

In 2009, he was awarded a Gauss Lectureship by the German Mathematical Society.

In 2024, he was awarded the Cantor Medal by the German Mathematical Society.
