= Dietrich Tzwyvel =

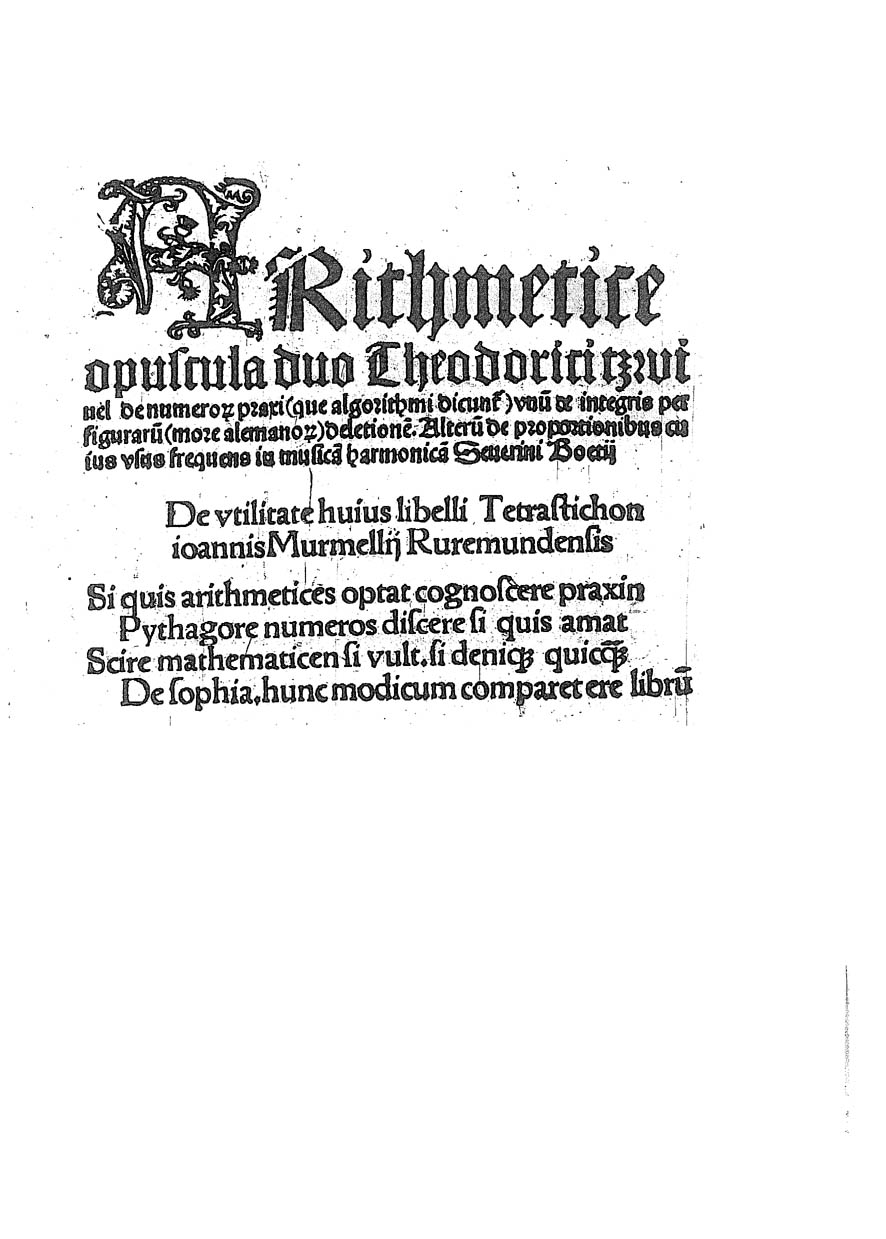
Arithmeticae opuscula duo, 1507

Dietrich Tzwyvel or Theodoricus Tzwyvel (c. 1470–1542) was a German mathematician, typographer and composer.

== Life ==
Tzwyvel designed the astronomical clock of the Münster Cathedral.

== Works ==
- Tzwyvel, Theodoricus (1507). Arithmeticae opuscula duo (in Latin). Köln: Heinrich Quentel.
