= Christof Schütte =

German mathematician

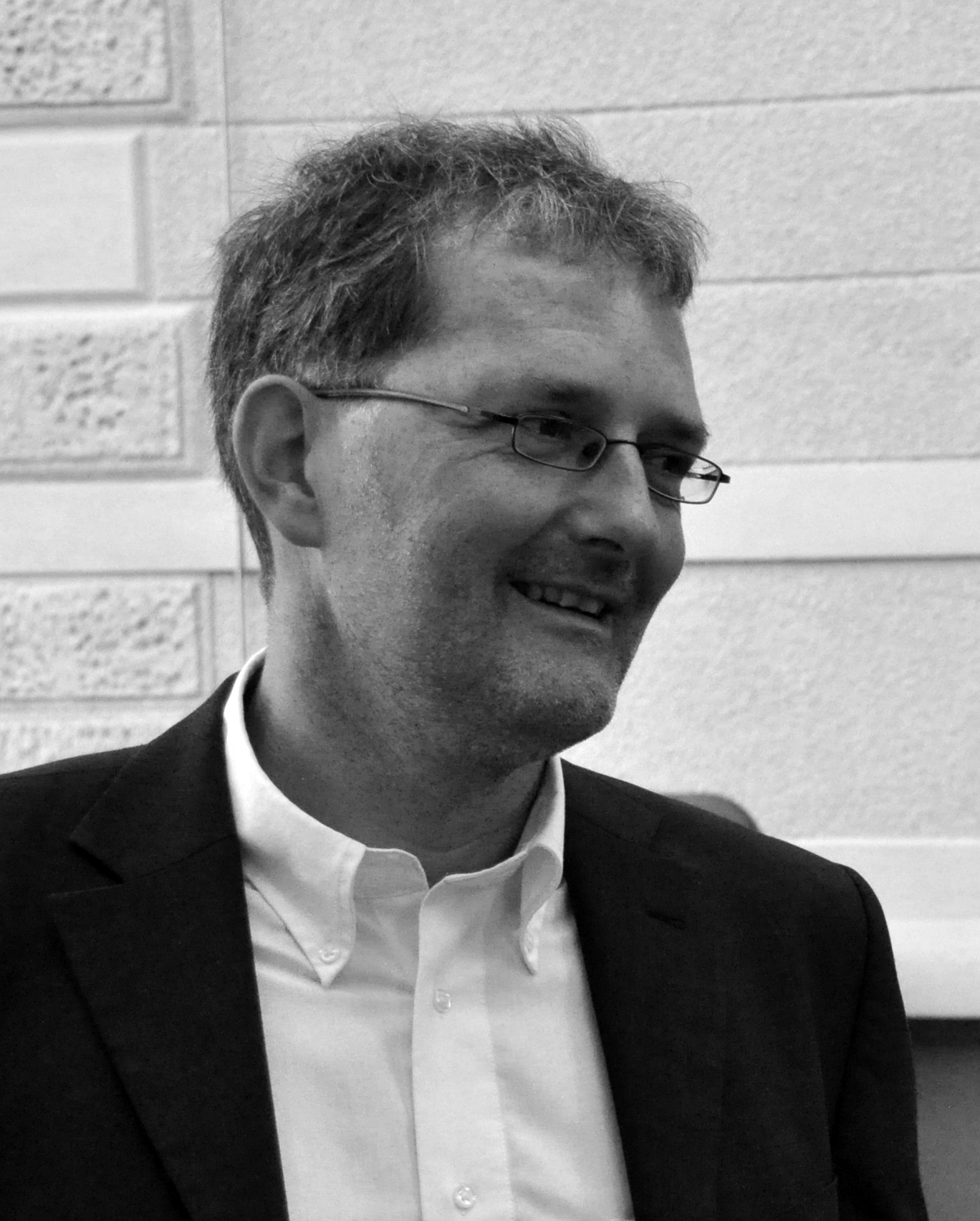
Christof Schütte

Christof Schütte (born April 10, 1966) is a German mathematician, working in applied and computational mathematics at the Freie Universität Berlin and the Zuse Institute Berlin.

== Education and career ==
Christof Schütte was born in Warburg. He graduated in physics from Paderborn University in 1991 and then obtained his PhD in mathematics under the supervision of Peter Deuflhard in 1994. He is currently a Professor in Numerical Mathematics and Scientific Computing at Freie Universität Berlin, and the president of the Zuse Institute Berlin.

Schütte has been one of the driving forces behind the Research Center “Mathematics for Key Technologies” (MATHEON) and has been its co-chair since 2008. Since 2015, he has acted as the head of the Research Campus MODAL, a public-private partnership between mathematics research institutes and 15 industrial companies, and as the co-chair of the Einstein Center for Mathematics in Berlin.

2021 Schütte has been elected chairman of the board of the NHR association (Verein für Nationales Hochleistungsrechnen e.V. - NHR-Verein).

== Research ==
Schütte's research has focused on multiscale modelling and simulation for complex systems, numerical mathematics, data-driven modelling and statistical learning with applications in the natural, materials and life sciences. He is a co-inventor of the transfer operator approach to metastability that has led to the development of widely used computational methods like Markov state models in molecular dynamics or the (extended) dynamic mode decomposition.

Schütte has been an invited speaker at the International Council for Industrial and Applied Mathematics (ICIAM) in Zürich, 2007, and at the International Congress of Mathematicians (ICM) in Hyderabad, 2010.

== Publications ==
Christof Schütte has published more than 150 articles in scientific journals.
