= Ernst Eduard Wiltheiss =

German mathematician

Ernst Eduard Wiltheiss

Ernst Eduard Wiltheiss (12 June 1855 in Worms, Germany – 7 July 1900 in Halle) was a German mathematician who worked on hyperelliptic functions and invariant theory.
