= Harald Garcke =

German mathematician (born 1963)

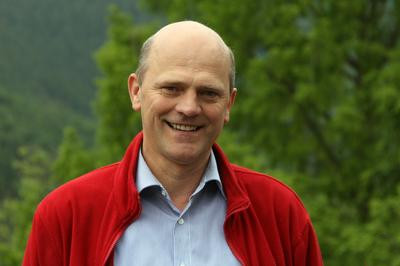
Garcke in Oberwolfach, 2015

Harald Garcke (born June 5, 1963 in Bremerhaven) is a German mathematician and professor at the University of Regensburg.

== Career and important results ==
Garcke studied Mathematics and Computer Science at the University of Bonn and finished his PhD 1993 as a student of Hans Wilhelm Alt (Travelling-Wave-Lösungen als Realisierung von Phasenübergängen bei Gedächtnismetallen). 1993/94 he was post-doc with Charles M. Elliott at the University of Sussex and from 1994 he was scientific assistant in Bonn where he finished his habilitation in 2000 (with the habilitation thesis On mathematical models for phase separation in elastically stressed solids). In the year 2001 he got offers for professur-positions at the Universities Regensburg and Duisburg. Since 2002 he is full professor at the University of Regensburg where he was dean of the Mathematics department from 2005 to 2007.

Garcke works on nonlinear partial differential equations, free boundary problems, phase field equations, numerical analysis and geometric evolution equations. Together with Christof Eck and Peter Knabner he is the author of a book on mathematical modelling.

His most important works are fundamental results on the Cahn-Hilliard equation, results on the thin film equation and work with Britta Nestler on phase field models. Work with J.W. Barrett and R. Nürnberg on the mathematics of snow crystals was also well received by the popular media.
