= Nicolas Guisnée =

French mathematician

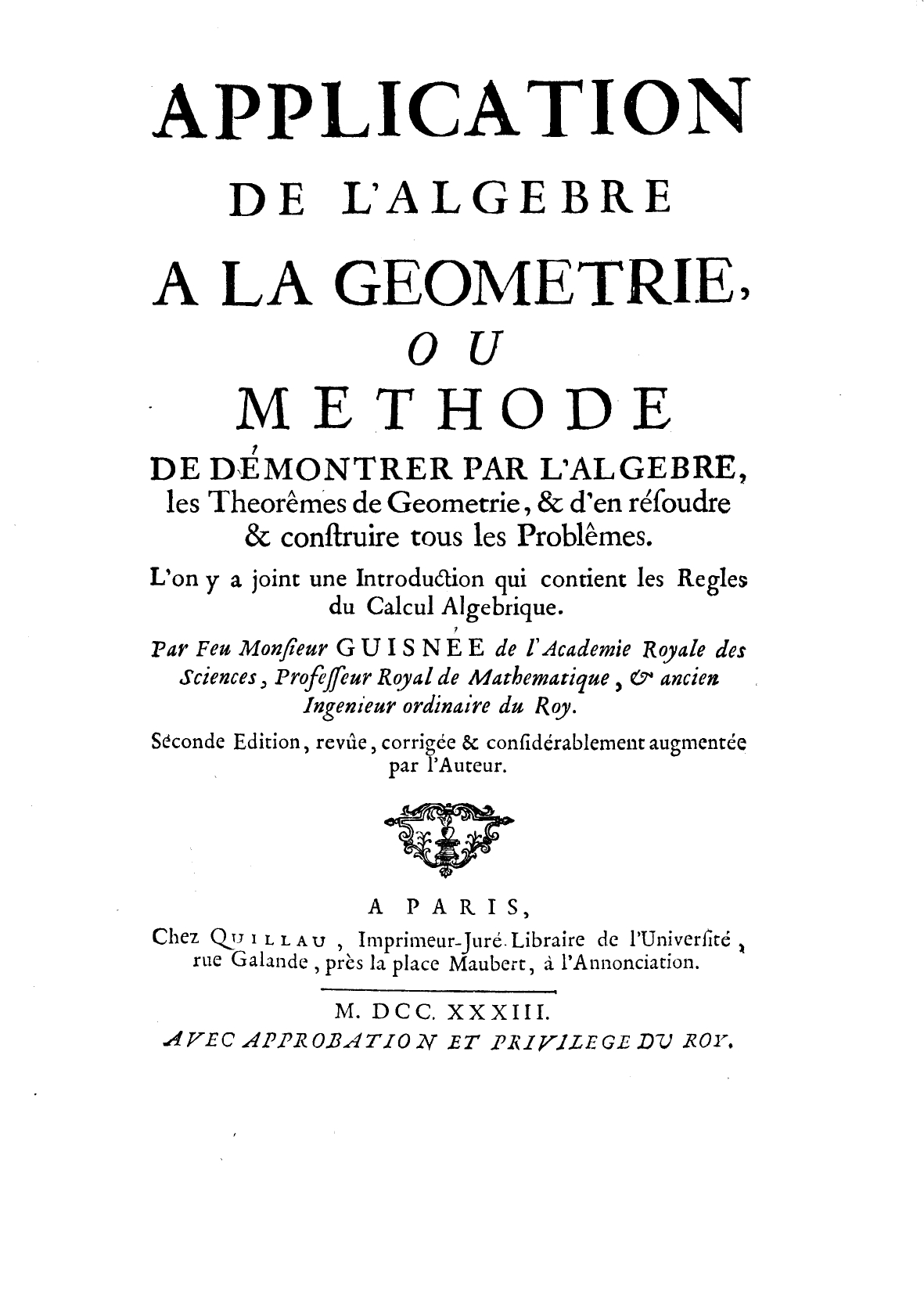
Application de l'algebre a la geometrie, 1733

Nicolas Guisnée (died 2 September 1718) was a French mathematician.

== Life ==
He studied mathematics with Nicolas Malebranche and was a protégé of Guillaume de l'Hôpital.

Engineer of the king, he was a royal professor of mathematics at the college of maître Gervais. François Nicole, Pierre Rémond de Montmort, Émilie du Châtelet and Pierre Louis Maupertuis are some of his students.

He was named "associé géomètre" at the Royal Academy of Sciences on 15 January 1707. He died in Paris.

== Works ==
- Guisnée, Nicolas (1733). Application de l'algebre a la geometrie (in French). Paris: Gabriel-François Quillau.
