= Edmund Schuster =

German engineer and mathematician

Edmund Schuster (7 September 1851 – 5 July 1932) was a German engineer and mathematician who contributed to the field of special functions and complex analysis being a pioneer in the field of harmonic analysis.

Schuster was born in Munich, Kingdom of Bavaria, in 1851. He studied in Bonn and Leipzig, and in 1875 he moved with his family to Chile. After a short period in Santiago de Chile he moved to Valdivia, in the south of the country, where he lived until his death, in 1932. In Valdivia, Schuster initiated a school of mathematics and founded the Acta Philosophica Valdiviana, in 1876.

Schuster is known in the field of harmonic analysis for the function that receives his name, whose analytic structure exhibits interesting properties. In particular, its roots, usually denoted $\Theta_\nu$, are given by

$$\Theta_\nu = 2 \left( \frac{1}{\sqrt{\nu}} + \sqrt{\nu}\right) \sin \left( \frac{2}{3} \arctan \sqrt{\nu} \right)$$

where $\nu$ represents a real number that labels the order of the Schuster function. The zeros of the Schuster function can also be written in terms of a complex variable $z=1 + i \sqrt{\nu }$, namely

$$\Theta_\nu = 2 (z\bar{z})^{2/3} \frac{z^{2/3} - \bar{z}^{2/3}}{z - \bar{z} }$$

where $\bar{z}=1 - i \sqrt{\nu }$ is the complex conjugate of ${z}$. This function is used also in physics.

Schuster has also made contributions to civil engineering.

== See also ==
- Special functions
- Complex analysis
