= Anna Wienhard =

German mathematician

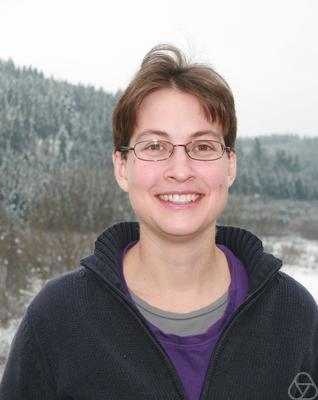
Wienhard at Oberwolfach, 2010

Anna Katharina Wienhard (born 1977) is a German mathematician whose research concerns differential geometry, and especially the use of higher Teichmüller spaces to study the deformation theory of symmetric geometric structures. She is a director at the Max Planck Institute for Mathematics in the Sciences.

== Education and career ==
Wienhard did her undergraduate studies at the University of Bonn, earning a double degree in theology and mathematics. Continuing at Bonn, she earned a doctorate in 2004 under the joint supervision of Hans Werner Ballmann and Marc Burger.

After holding temporary positions at the University of Basel, Institute for Advanced Study, and University of Chicago, she took a faculty position at Princeton University in 2007. She moved to Heidelberg as a full professor in 2012 and to Leipzig as a research director at the Max Planck Institute for Mathematics in the Sciences in 2022.

== Recognition ==
From 2009 to 2013, Wienhard was a member of the Young Academy of the German Academy of Sciences Leopoldina and Berlin-Brandenburg Academy of Sciences and Humanities. In 2012, she became one of the inaugural fellows of the American Mathematical Society. She was elected as a regular member of the Leopoldina in 2023.

She was the Emmy Noether Lecturer of the German Mathematical Society in 2012, and an invited speaker at the 2018 International Congress of Mathematicians. She was named MSRI Clay Senior Scholar for Fall 2019.
