= Doug Dersch =

Canadian football player

Profile
- Position: Linebacker

Personal information
- Born: April 18, 1946 (age 80); Innisfail, Alberta, Canada
- Died: September 20, 2025
- Listed height: 6 ft 2 in (1.88 m)
- Listed weight: 230 lb (104 kg)

Career information
- University: Calgary
- CFL draft: 1968: 2nd round, 13th overall pick

Career history
- 1968: Edmonton Eskimos
- 1969: Montreal Alouettes
- 1970: Edmonton Eskimos
- 1971: Hamilton Tiger-Cats
- 1972: Toronto Argonauts
- 1972: Hamilton Tiger-Cats

Awards and highlights
- Grey Cup champion (1972)

Doug Dersch (born April 18, 1946) was a Canadian professional football player who played for the Edmonton Eskimos, Montreal Alouettes, Hamilton Tiger-Cats and Toronto Argonauts. He won the Grey Cup with Hamilton in 1972. He played college football at the University of Calgary.
