= Karl Longin Zeller =

German mathematician and computer scientist

Karl Longin Zeller (December 28, 1924, Šiauliai, Lithuania – July 20, 2006, Tübingen) was a German mathematician and computer scientist who worked in numerical analysis and approximation theory. He is the namesake of Zeller operators.

Zeller was drafted into the Wehrmacht, and lost his right arm on the Soviet front of World War II. He earned his Ph.D. from the University of Tübingen in 1950, under the supervision of Konrad Knopp and Erich Kamke, and remained at Tübingen for most of his career as a professor and as director of the computer center. He left Tübingen in 1959 for a professorship in Stuttgart but returned to Tübingen in 1960 with a personal chair in "the mathematics of supercomputer facilities" (German: Mathematik der Hochleistungsrechenanlagen), making him one of the founders of computer science in Germany. He has over 200 academic descendants.

In 1993, he was given an honorary doctorate by the University of Siegen.

== Selected publications ==
- Theorie der Limitierungsverfahren, Berlin: Springer (1st edition, 1958) (2nd edition, 1970)
