= Christoph Zenger =

German mathematician (born 1940)

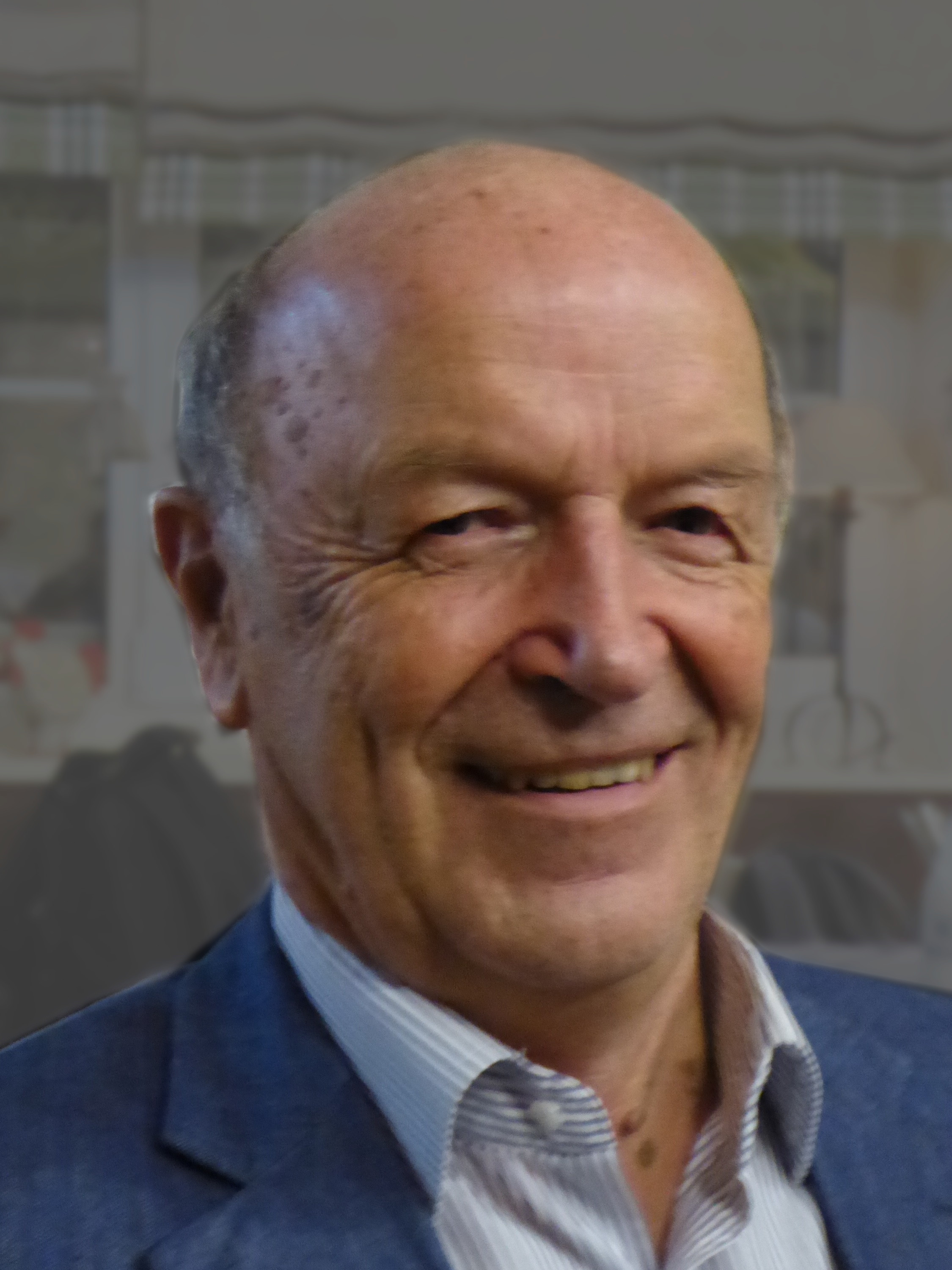
Christoph Zenger

Christoph Zenger (born 10 August 1940) is a German mathematician.

== Career ==
Born in Lindau, Zenger studied physics at LMU Munich and did a doctorate in mathematics (theory of normed vector spaces) in 1967. In 1973, he did his habilitation in mathematics and in 1977, he became professor of mathematics at Technical University of Munich (TUM). In 1980, he accepted an offer of a full professorship from the University of the Bundeswehr Munich. In 1982, he returned to TUM to fill a chair in computer science. In 2000, Zenger was selected as a member of the Bavarian Academy of Sciences and Humanities. He retired in 2005, but is still active in research.

The most important of Zenger's scientific achievements is the discovery of how to harness approximation on sparse grids for the efficient solution of elliptic partial differential equations in higher dimensions.

Beside his substantial scientific work, Zenger will be remembered for his contributions to contemporary wisdom, the most notable of which have been collected in the volume Löwenzähnchen am Bachesrand.

== Selected publications ==
- A cache-oblivious self-adaptive full multigrid method (2006)
- Der Fluch der Dimension in der numerischen Simulation (2004)
- with Hans-Joachim Bungartz and Michael Griebel: Einführung in die Computergraphik. Vieweg, Braunschweig 2002, ISBN 3-528-16769-6
- with Sascha Hilgenfeldt and Robert Balder: Sparse Grids. SFB, München 1995.
- with Michael Griebel and Michael Schneider: A combination technique for the solution of sparse grid problems. SFB, München 1990
