= Angelika Steger =

Mathematician and computer scientist

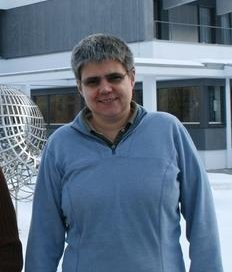
Steger at Oberwolfach, 2011

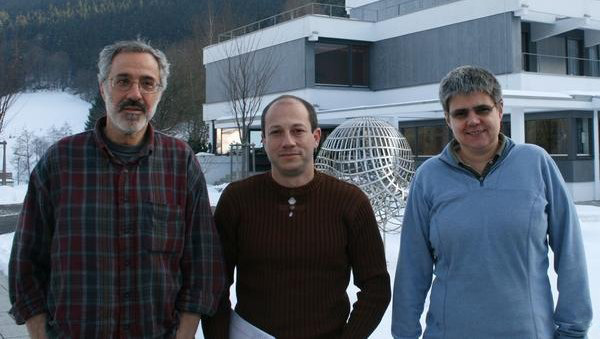
Organizers of a 2011 MFO workshop on combinatorics, left to right: Jeff Kahn, Benjamin Sudakov, Angelika Steger

Angelika Steger (born 1962) is a mathematician and computer scientist whose research interests include graph theory, randomized algorithms, and approximation algorithms. She is a professor at ETH Zurich.

== Education and career ==
After earlier studies at the University of Freiburg and Heidelberg University, Steger earned a master's degree from Stony Brook University in 1985. She completed a doctorate from the University of Bonn in 1990, under the supervision of Hans Jürgen Prömel, with a dissertation on random combinatorial structures, and earned her habilitation from Bonn in 1994. After a visiting position at the University of Kiel, she became a professor at the University of Duisburg in 1995, moved to the Technical University of Munich in 1996, and moved again to ETH Zurich in 2003.

== Books ==
Steger is the author of a German-language textbook on combinatorics:

- Steger, Angelika (2007). Diskrete Strukturen Bd. 1. Kombinatorik, Graphentheorie, Algebra / Angelika Steger (in German). Berlin. ISBN 978-3-540-46660-4. OCLC 196449143.

and a monograph on the Steiner tree problem:

- Prömel, Hans Jürgen; Steger, Angelika (2002). The Steiner Tree Problem : a Tour through Graphs, Algorithms, and Complexity. Wiesbaden: Vieweg+Teubner Verlag. ISBN 978-3-322-80291-0. OCLC 851804416.

== Recognition ==
Steger was elected to the Academy of Sciences Leopoldina in 2007. She was an invited speaker at the International Congress of Mathematicians in 2014.
