= Heide Gluesing-Luerssen =

German mathematician (born 1961)

Heide Gluesing-Luerssen (born 1961) is a German mathematician specializing in algebraic coding theory. She is currently the Royster Research Professor at University of Kentucky.

== Education and career ==
Gluesing-Luerssen earned her doctorate in 1991 from the University of Bremen, and taught in the mathematics department of the University of Oldenburg from 1993 to 2004. While there, she completed a habilitation in 2000. She moved to the University of Groningen in 2004, and to Kentucky in 2007.

== Contributions ==
She is the author of the book Linear delay-differential systems with commensurate delays: an algebraic approach (Lecture Notes in Mathematics 1770, Springer-Verlag, 2002).

- Gluesing-Luerssen, Heide (2002). Linear delay-differential systems with commensurate delays : an algebraic approach. Berlin: Springer. ISBN 978-3-540-45543-1. OCLC 50151673.
