= Karl Seebach =

German mathematician

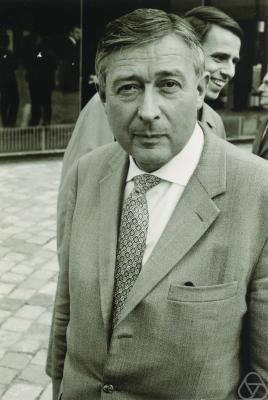
Karl Seebach

Karl Seebach (28 June 1912 in Munich – 18 July 2007 in Munich) was a German mathematician.

Seebach earned his doctorate at the Ludwig-Maximilians-Universität München (LMU Munich) under Heinrich Tietze and Arnold Sommerfeld, in 1938. From 1977 to 1981, he held the Chair for Didactics of Mathematics at LMU Munich.

Seebach was the author of many mathematics textbooks for the Gymnasium.

== Books ==
- Josef Breuer, Paul Knabe, Josef Lauter, Karl Seebach, and Klaus Wigand Handbuch der Schulmatematik: Band 2 Algebra (Hermann Schroedel)
- Johannes Blume, Gerhard Frey, Heinrich Gall, Paul Knabe, Paul Mönnig, Karl Seebach, and Klaus Wigand Handbuch der Schulmathematik: Band 5 Einzelfragen der Mathematik (Hermann Schroedel)
- Ludwig Schecher and Karl Seebach Einführung in die Mathematik. Bd. 1 (Schmidt, 1950)
- Karl Seebach and Reinhold Federle Vorschläge zum Aufbau der Analytischen Geometrie in vektorieller Behandlung (Ehrenwirth, 1965)
- Friedrich Barth, Karl Seebach, and Ernst Winkler Vorschläge zur Behandlung der geometrischen Abbildungen in der Ebene (Ehrenwirth, 1968)
- Karl Seebach and Edmund Kösel Arbeitsblätter zum Lehrerkolleg. Hauptschule. Schuljahr 9. H. 3. Mathematik, Physik, Chemie (TR-Verlagsunion, 1969)
