= Thomas von Randow =

German mathematician and journalist

Thomas von Randow (26 December 1921 Breslau, Schlesien – 29 July 2009 Hamburg) was a German mathematician and journalist who published mathematical and logical puzzles under the pseudonym Zweistein in the "Logelei" column in Die Zeit. (After 2005 his column and pseudonym were continued by Bernhard Seckinger and Immanuel Halupczok.)

== Publications ==
Many of his logic puzzles were published in the following books:

- 99 Logeleien von Zweistein. Christian Wegner, Hamburg 1968
- Neue Logeleien von Zweistein. Hoffmann und Campe, Hamburg 1976
- Logeleien für Kenner. Hoffmann und Campe, Hamburg 1975
- 88 neue Logeleien. Nymphenburger, München 1983
- 87 neue Logeleien. Rasch und Röhring, Hamburg 1985
- Weitere Logeleien von Zweistein. Deutscher Taschenbuchverlag (dtv), München 1985, ISBN 3-485-00446-4
- Zweisteins Zahlenmagie. Mathematisches und Mystisches über einen abstrakten Gebrauchsgegenstand. Von Eins bis Dreizehn. Illustrationen von Gerhard Gepp. Christian Brandstätter, Wien 1993, ISBN 3854474814
- Zweisteins Zahlen-Logeleien. Insel, Frankfurt am Main und Leipzig 1993, ISBN 3-458-33210-3
