= Nina Gantert =

Swiss and German probability theorist

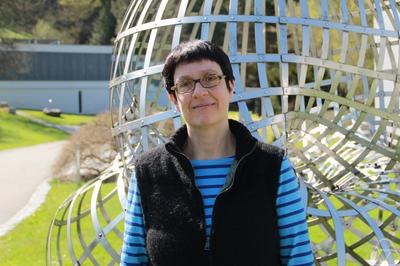
Nina Gantert

Nina Gantert is a Swiss and German probability theorist, and a Fellow of the Institute of Mathematical Statistics. She holds the chair for probability in the department of mathematics at the Technical University of Munich, a position she has held since 2011 when the chair was established.

== Research ==
Her research interests include the use of random walks to model transport in disordered media, and stochastic processes more generally. She is also interested in physical and biological applications of probability theory.

== Education and career ==
After studying at ETH Zurich, Gantert earned her PhD from the University of Bonn in 1991. Her dissertation, Einige große Abweichungen der Brownschen Bewegung [some large deviations for Brownian motion] was supervised by Hans Föllmer.

After postdoctoral research and a habilitation at Technische Universität Berlin, she held faculty positions at the Karlsruhe Institute of Technology and the University of Münster before moving to Munich in 2011.
