= Barbara Niethammer =

German mathematician and materials scientist

Barbara Niethammer (born 1967) is a German mathematician and materials scientist who works as a professor at the Hausdorff Center for Mathematics at the University of Bonn. Her research concerns partial differential equations for physical materials, and in particular the phenomenon of Ostwald ripening by which particles in liquids grow over time.

== Education and career ==
Niethammer completed her PhD in 1996 at the University of Bonn, under the supervision of Hans Wilhelm Alt. Her dissertation was Approximation of Coarsening Madels by Homogenization of a Stefan Problem.

After postdoctoral research at the Courant Institute, she returned to Bonn for her habilitation in 2002, after which she became in 2003 a professor at the Humboldt University of Berlin. She moved to the University of Oxford in 2007, where she was a fellow of St Edmund Hall. In 2012 she returned as a professor to the University of Bonn.

== Recognition ==
Niethammer won the Richard von Mises Prize of the Gesellschaft für Angewandte Mathematik und Mechanik in 2003 for her work on Ostwald ripening, and the Whitehead Prize of the London Mathematical Society in 2011 "for her deep and rigorous contributions to material science, especially on the Lifshitz–Slyozov–Wagner and Becker–Doering equations".

She was an invited speaker at the International Congress of Mathematicians in 2014.
