= Ferdinand Ernst Karl Herberstein =

German mathematician

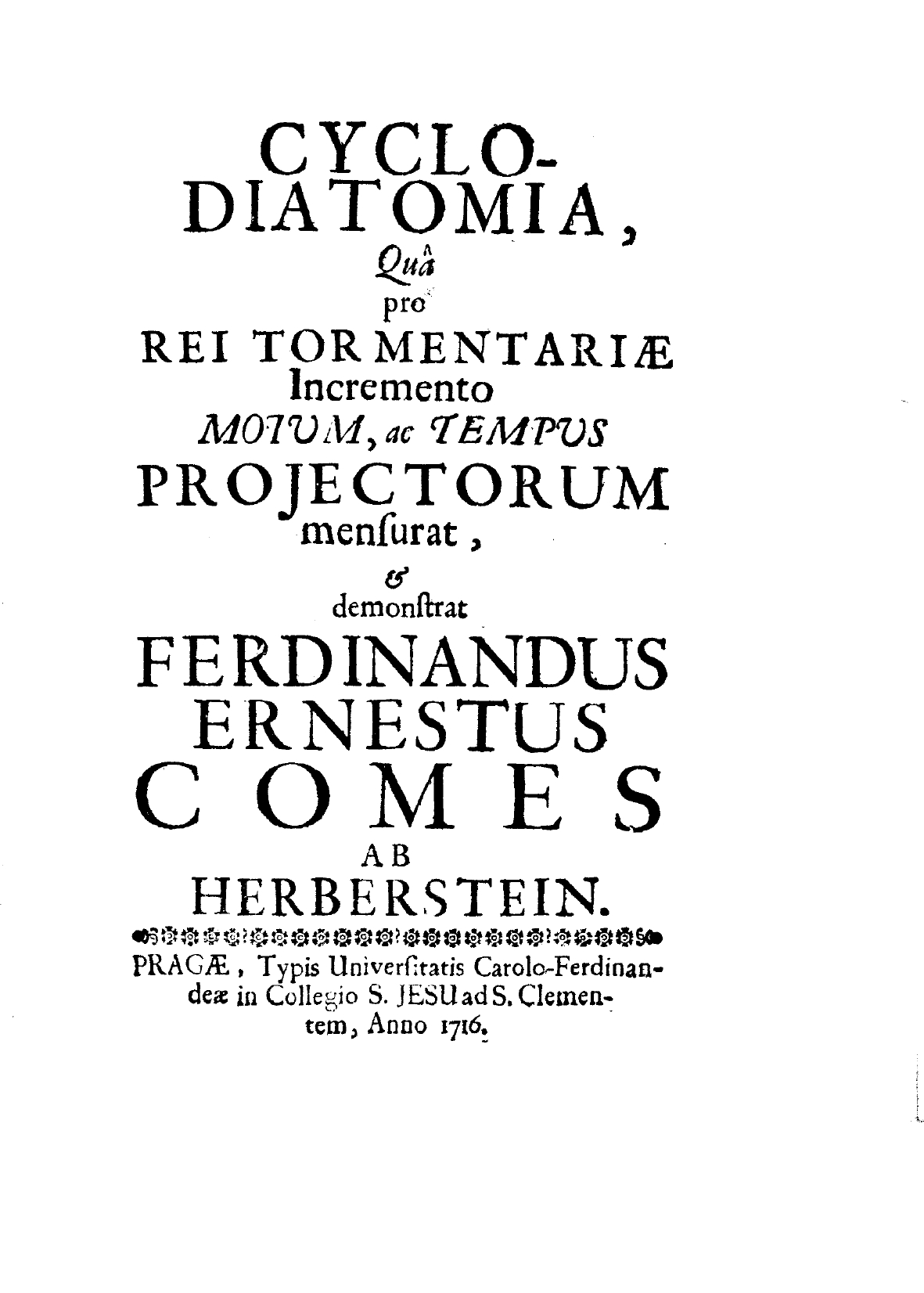
Cyclo-diatomia, 1716

Ferdinand Ernst Karl count of Herberstein (died 1720) was a German mathematician and a military officer.

== Life ==
Son of Karl Sigmund, he lived in Bohemia. He wrote several books about mathematics and geometry. Some of the books are signed using the pseudonym of "Amari de Lapide".

== Works ==
- Norma et regula statica intersectione circulorum desumta, Praga 1686
- Mathemata adversu umbratiles Petri Poireti impetus propugnata, Praga, 1709
- Diatome circulorum seu specimen geometricum, Praga, 1710
- Erotema politico-philologicum an studium Geometriae rempublicam administranti obstaculo sit an adminiculo?, Praga, 1712
- Herberstein, Ferdinand Ernst Karl (1716). Cyclo-diatomia (in Latin). Pragae: typis universitatis Carolo-Ferdinandeae in Collegio sJesu ad sClementem.
- (Amari de Lapide) De machinis pro rei tormentariae incremento etc. tractandis
- (Amari de Lapide) Artis technicae via plana et facilis, Stettino 1736
