= Robert Edouard Moritz =

German-American mathematician

Robert Edouard Moritz (2 Jun 1868 – 28 Dec 1940) was a German-American mathematician. He published about 75 books and papers. For over 30 years he was head of the mathematics department at the University of Washington.

== Biography ==
Moritz was born in Schleswig-Holstein to Karl R. and Maria Stahlhut Moritz, and emigrated to the United States at the age of twelve where the family settled on a farm in Nebraska. From 1885 to 1892 he attended Hastings College in Hastings, Nebraska, and then studied another year at the University of Chicago. After two summer quarters in the next years he received his MA in mathematics in 1896.

In 1893 he started his academic career as assistant professor in mathematics and physics back at Hastings College. In 1898 he moved to the University of Nebraska, where he was appointed instructor in mathematics, and obtained his PhD in 1901. The next year he studied in Europe under Heinrich Martin Weber and Theodor Reye, obtaining a second PhD at the University of Strassburg in 1902. Back in the United States he worked two years at the University of Nebraska, before moving to the University of Washington where he was appointed professor and head of the Department of Mathematics and Astronomy.

He died in Seattle in the state of Washington in 1940 at the age of 72.

== Publications by Moritz, a selection ==
- Plane and Spherical Trigonometry. John Wiley and Sons, 1911, 1913.
- On Mathematics and Mathematicians, Macmillan 1914, 1942, 1958; also published as Memorabilia Mathematica; Or, The Philomath's Quotation-book, Macmillan 1914.
- A Short Course in College Mathematics, Macmillan, 1919, 1920.
