= Elisabeth M. Werner =

American mathematician

- Education: Pierre and Marie Curie University
- Scientific career
- Fields: Convex geometry, Functional analysis, Probability theory
- Workplaces: Case Western Reserve University
- Thesis: (1989)
- Doctoral advisors: Gilles Godefroy
- Website: https://case.edu/artsci/math/werner/

Elisabeth M. Werner is a mathematician who works as a professor of mathematics at Case Western Reserve University, as associate director of the Institute for Mathematics and its Applications, and as maître de conférences at the Lille University of Science and Technology. Her research interests include convex geometry, functional analysis, probability theory, and their applications.

Werner earned a diploma in mathematics from the University of Tübingen, in Germany, in 1985. She moved to France for her graduate studies, finishing her doctorate in 1989 at Pierre and Marie Curie University, under the supervision of Gilles Godefroy. On completing her doctorate she took a faculty position at Case, and two years later added her affiliation with Lille. At Case, she was promoted to full professor in 2002.

In 2012, she became one of the inaugural fellows of the American Mathematical Society.
