= Günter Asser =

German mathematician

- Born: 26 February 1926; Berlin
- Died: 23 March 2015 (aged 89); Greifswald
- Scientific career
- Fields: Mathematics
- Institutions: University of Greifswald
- Theses: Eine semantische Charakterisierung der deduktiv abgeschlossenen Mengen des Prädikatenkalküls der ersten Stufe (1954); Theorie der log. Auswahlfunktionen (1958)
- Doctoral advisors: Karl Schröter, Heinrich Grell

Günter Asser (26 February 1926, Berlin – 23 March 2015) was a professor emeritus of logic and mathematics at the University of Greifswald. He published numerous volumes on philosophers and mathematicians. His own research was in computability theory.

In 1954, with his doctoral advisor Karl Schröter, he co-founded the journal Zeitschrift für Mathematische Logik und Grundlagen der Mathematik, which later became Mathematical Logic Quarterly. In 1977, Günter Asser became member of the German Academy of Sciences at Berlin.

== See also ==
- Spectrum of a sentence
