= Karl Schröter =

German mathematician (1905–1977)

- Picture of Karl Schröter studying
- Born: Karl Walter Schröter; 7 September 1905; Biebrich near Wiesbaden, Hesse-Darmstadt, German Empire
- Died: 22 August 1977 (aged 71); East Berlin, East Germany
- Education: Göttingen; Heidelberg; Frankfurt am Main; University of Münster
- Known for: Semantic consequences Provability logic
- Scientific career
- Fields: Mathematics; Logic
- Workplaces: University of Münster
- Doctoral advisor: Heinrich Scholz
- Doctoral students: Dieter Klaua

Karl Walter Schröter (7 September 1905 – 22 August 1977) was a German mathematician and logician. He worked as a mathematical theoretician and cryptanalyst for the civilian Pers Z S, the cipher bureau of the Foreign Office (German: Auswärtiges Amt), from the spring of 1941 to the end of World War II. Later on, after the war, he made important contributions concerning semantic consequences (German: semantische Folgerungsrelationen) and provability logic (German: syntaktische Ableitbarkeitsrelationen) while at Humboldt University of Berlin.

== Education ==
From 1928 to 1936, Schröter studied mathematics, physics, philosophy, and psychology at the Universities of Göttingen, Heidelberg and Frankfurt am Main. Due to family reasons he had to interrupt his studies several times. He then worked in the mathematical logic group at the University of Münster led by Heinrich Scholz. From 1 April 1939 he was a research assistant at the Department of Philosophy at the University of Münster. On 20 December 1941 he took his examination for promotion of Dr. phil under the logician Heinrich Scholz studying mathematics, logic, and calculus with a thesis titled Ein allgemeiner Kalkülbegriff (English: A General Concept of Calculus). On 1 April 1941 he took a leave of absence to join Pers Z S, the Foreign Office civilian cipher bureau, working as a mathematician. However, even during this time he continued to work on problems of basic mathematical research.

== Career ==
On 19 March 1943 he presented the application to the Faculty of Philosophy and Natural Sciences, with the publication Axiomatisierung der Fregeschen Aussagenkalküle (English: Axiomatisation of Frege's Propositional Calculus), to be admitted to his Habilitation. On the basis of the positive opinions of Heinrich Scholz and Adolf Kratzer, the degree of Doctor rerum naturalium habilitatus was awarded to him by certificate of 22 May 1943. On 9 June 1943 the report on the completed Habilitation was given to the Reich Minister. On 1, 2 and 3 July 1943 he held a public trial lecture on the topic Der Nutzen der mathematischen Logik für die Mathematik (English: The Benefits of Mathematical Logic for Mathematics) as a prerequisite for a civil service position as a lecturer. On 18 August 1943 he was appointed lecturer with the authorisation to teach "Mathematical Logic and Fundamental Research", all the while still being employed in Berlin as a "scientific assistant worker" at Pers Z S.

Karl Schröter remained at the University of Münster from 31 December 1943 until his contract was up on 31 April 1945, when he was taken prisoner by the Counterintelligence Corps (CIC). From early May to 30 September 1945 he appeared before a joint Anglo-American Commission, first in London, then in Marburg, concerning his work at Pers Z S during the war. After completion, he was dismissed in Marburg after the CIC had determined his political attitude. In the winter semester of 1945/46 he was affiliated as a lecturer in Münster.

From May 1946 until his appointment to Berlin, Schröter was working at Münster as a substitute for the Review Committee of the Denazification Main Committee at the Westfälische Landesuniversität. In 1948, Karl Schröter was appointed Professor Extraordinarius for mathematical logic at Humboldt University in Berlin.

In 1967, he became director of the Institute for pure mathematics of the German Academy of Sciences at Berlin.

He was elected corresponding member in 1962 and two years later ordinary member of the German Academy of Sciences at Berlin.

In 1955, Schröter together with Günter Asser founded the Zeitschrift für Mathematische Logik und Grundlagen der Mathematik (English: Journal of mathematical logic and foundations of mathematics) which since 1991 is known as Mathematical Logic Quarterly.

== Publications ==
- Schröter, Karl (1941). Ein allgemeiner Kalkülbegriff [A General Concept of Calculus]. Forschungen zur Logik und zur Grundlegung der exakten Wissenschaften, Neue Folge. Heft 6 (Dissertation, Philosophische und Naturwissenschaftliche Fakultät, Universität Münster, 1941) (in German). Leipzig: S. Hirzel.
- Schröter, Karl (1943). Axiomatisierung der Fregeschen Aussagenkalküle [Axiomatisation of Frege's Propositional Calculus]. Forschungen zur Logik und zur Grundlegung der exakten Wissenschaften, Neue Folge. Heft 8 (in German). Leipzig: S. Hirzel.
