= Otto Dersch =

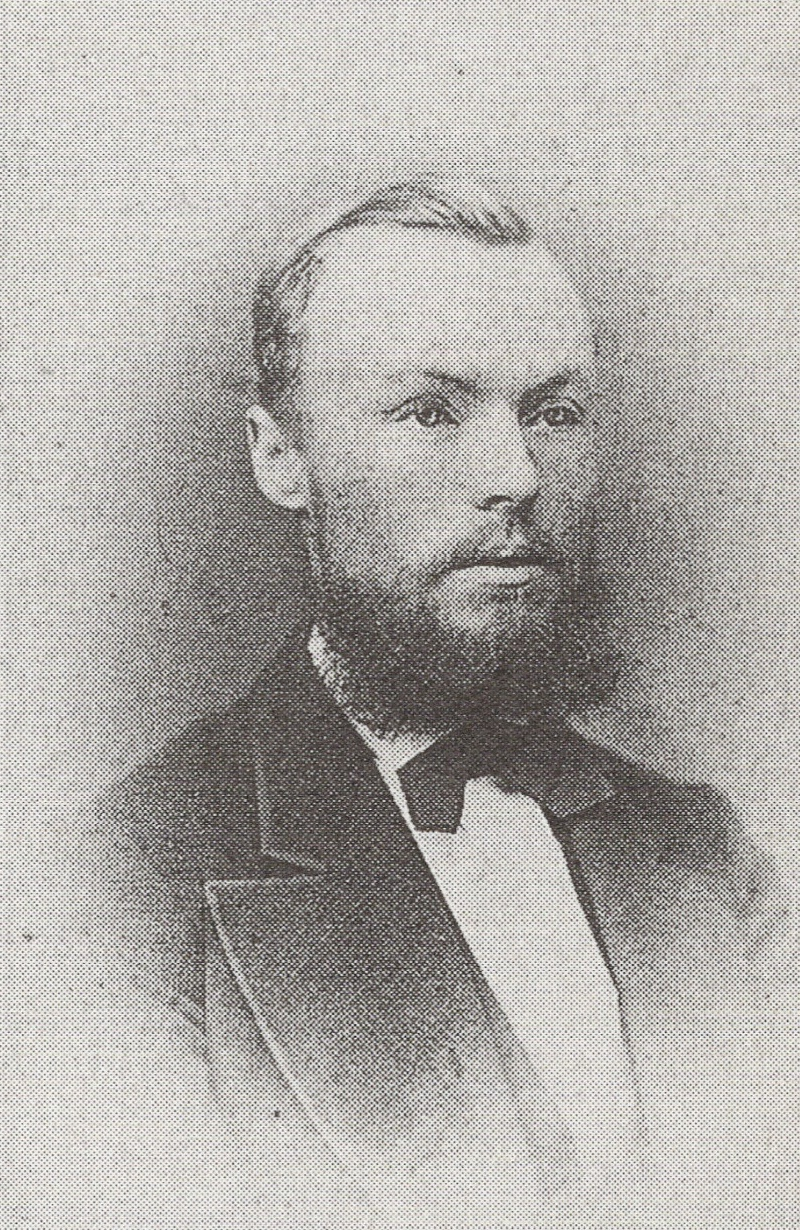
Otto Georg Dersch

Otto Georg Dersch (born March 17, 1848, in Ortenberg, Hesse) was a German mathematician who worked in algebraic geometry. Dersch got his Ph.D. 1873 in Gießen. He was teacher in Groß-Umstadt and Darmstadt and then director of a secondary school in Offenbach am Main, and then became director of a secondary school (Oberrealschule) in Darmstadt until at least 1915.

== Publications ==
- Dersch, O. (1874), "Doppeltangenten einer Curve n^{ter} Ordnung", Mathematische Annalen, 7 (4): 497–511, doi:10.1007/BF02104919, S2CID 123057788
- Dersch, O. (1894), Geschichte der Grossherzoglichen Real-und Landwirtschaftsschule zu Gross-Umstadt in den 25 Jahren ihres Bestehens, G. Lindauer
