= Michael Griebel =

German mathematician

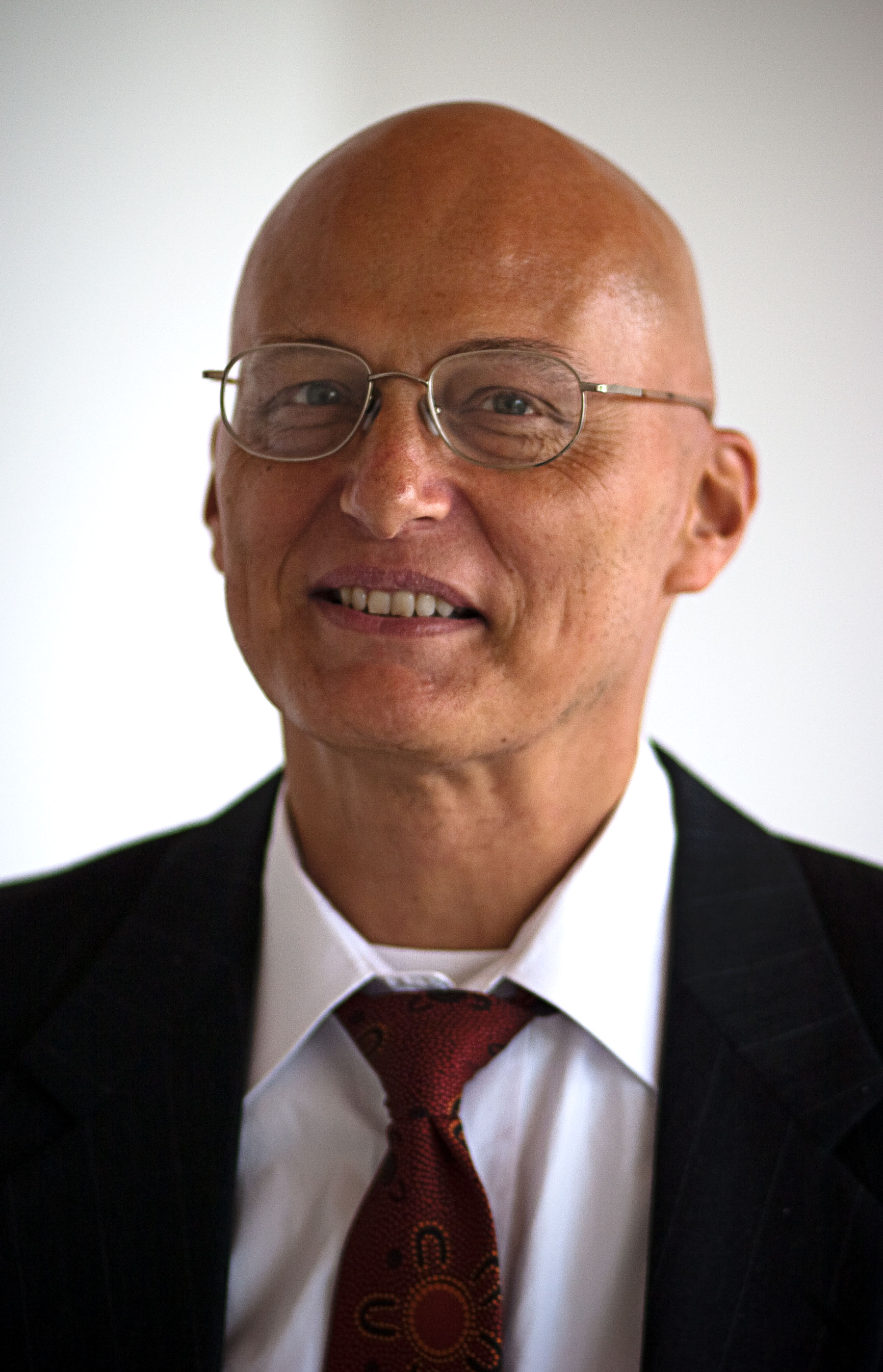
- Michael Griebel (2010)

Michael Griebel is a German mathematician. His research focus lies on scientific computing, and he helped develop computer algorithms for sparse grids.

Griebel was director of the Institute for Numerical Simulation at the University of Bonn from 2003 to 2016. He is currently director of the Fraunhofer Institute for Algorithms and Scientific Computing in Sankt Augustin.
