= Adolf Schepp =

German mathematician

Adolf Schepp (1837 – 9 March 1905) was a German mathematician who translated several mathematical works from English and Italian into German.
