= John Müller =

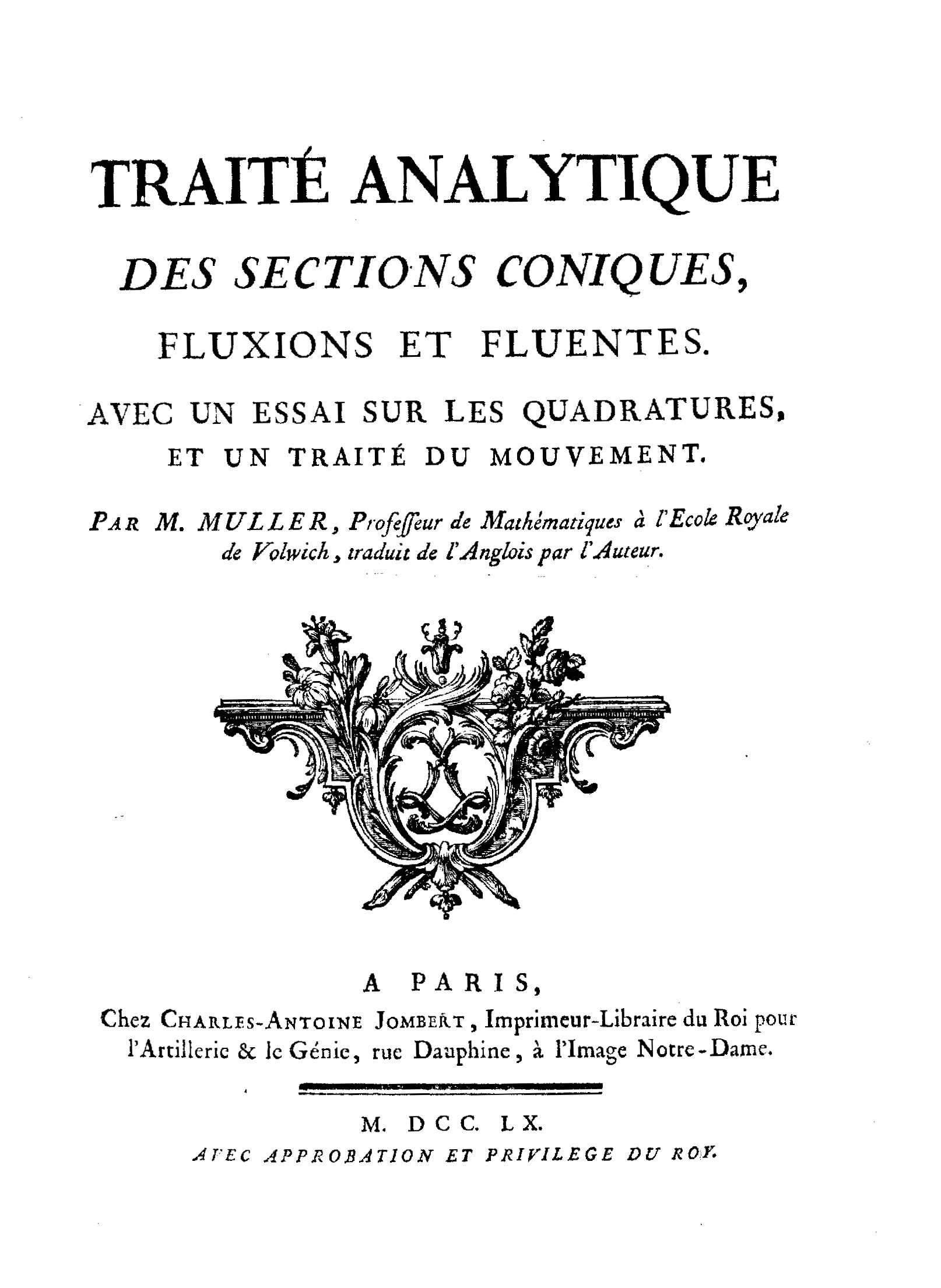
Mathematical Treatise, 1760

John Muller (1699 – June 1784) was a mathematician and engineer from the Holy Roman Empire.

== Life ==
Born Johann Müller in the Holy Roman Empire, he moved to London in 1736.

In 1741 he was appointed deputy head of the Royal Military Academy, Woolwich, where he performed all the teaching duties of Martin Folkes. He transformed the institution into a disciplined cadet academy with the help of Thomas Simpson. In 1754 he became first master of the Academy, after Folkes's death. He was later appointed Professor of Artillery and Fortification (and "Preceptor of Engineering, etc. to his Royal Highness the Duke of Gloucester"); he retired in 1766. During his time at the Academy Muller carried out gunnery experiments with Colonel Desaguliers, described in the second edition of A Treatise of Artillery.

Muller married Mary Horn on 29 December 1774, at St Martin-in-the-Fields, Westminster. He died at his home in Eaton Street (now Greet Street), London in June 1784. The contents of his library were auctioned at the Military Library, Whitehall early in 1785.

Muller’s works were concerned with mathematics and fortification. At the Academy there were strict instructions on which topics each instructor was to teach, which included a list of works to be used; several of Muller's books were his included.

== Works ==
- A Mathematical Treatise: Containing a System of Conic-sections; with the doctrine of fluxions and fluents, applied to various subjects (1736)
- A Treatise Containing the Elementary Part of Fortification (1746)
- Elements of Mathematics (1748, also titled A System of Mathematics)
- A Treatise Containing the Practical Part of Fortification (1755)
- A Treatise on Artillery (1757; later editions were titled A Treatise of Artillery)
- The Field Engineer; translated from the French (1759)
- Traité analytique des sections coniques, fluxions et fluentes. Avec un essai sur les quadratures, et un traité du mouvement (1760)
- A New System of Mathematics (1769)
- New Elements of Mathematics: or, Euclid corrected (1773)
