= Karl Eduard Zetzsche =

German mathematician and physicist

Karl Eduard Zetzsche (March 11, 1830, in Altenberg – April 18, 1894, in Dresden) was a German mathematician and physicist.

== Biography ==
He studied in Dresden and Vienna, and in 1856 entered the Austrian telegraph service. In 1858, he became a teacher in the industrial high school at Chemnitz and, in 1876, a professor of telegraphy in the Polytechnic Institute at Dresden. In 1880, he was appointed telegraph engineer in the Imperial Post Office at Berlin. In 1887, he retired from public service.

== Works ==
- Die Kopiertelegraphen, Typendrucktelegraphen und die Doppeltelegraphie (1865)
- Die elektrischen Telegraphen (1860)
- Katechismus der elektrischen Telegraphie (6th ed., 1883)
- Abriss der Geschichte der elektrischen Telegraphie (1874)
- Die Entwickelung der antomatischen Telegraphie (1875)
- Handbuch der elektrischen Telegraphie (together with Frölich, Henneberg, and Kohlfürst) (1877–1895)
