= Richard Meyer (mathematician) =

Mathematician and engineer

Richard Ernst Meyer (23 March 1919 – 16 January 2008) was a mathematician and engineer.

Born in Berlin, Germany, Meyer received his PhD in aeronautical engineering from ETH Zürich in 1946. He worked at the University of Manchester and in 1953, he got a job as a senior lecturer in aeronautical engineering at the University of Sydney. He studied turbines, which led him to the research of supersonic aeronautics and the theory of characteristics. Meyer did both theoretical and experimental research; he set up a supersonic laboratory in Australia. He was elected into the Australian Academy of Science in 1956.

In 1957, Meyer moved to the department of applied mathematics at Brown University. By this time, he had also become interested in the theory of water waves. Additionally, he looked into theoretical aspects of hyperbolic and singular partial differential equations and asymptotics. Meyer became a professor of mathematics at the University of Wisconsin–Madison in 1964, where he worked until he was named professor emeritus in 1994.

Meyer died on 16 January 2008.
