= Erich Kamke =

German mathematician (1890–1961)

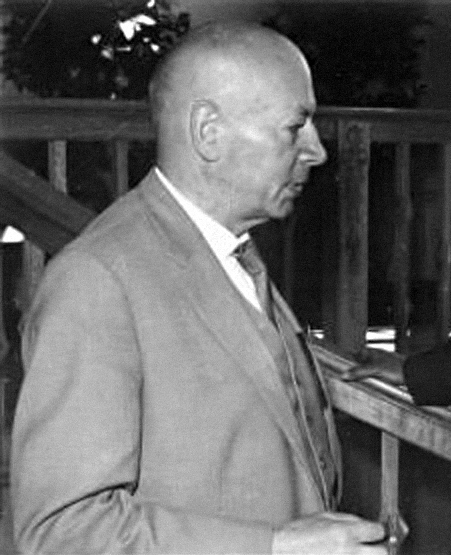
- Born: 18 August 1890; Marienburg, German Empire
- Died: 28 September 1961 (aged 71); Rottenburg am Neckar, Germany
- Education: University of Göttingen
- Scientific career
- Fields: Mathematics
- Workplaces: University of Tübingen
- Doctoral advisor: Edmund Landau
- Doctoral students: Karl Longin Zeller; Harro Heuser; Wolfgang Walter

Erich Kamke (18 August 1890 – 28 September 1961) was a German mathematician, who specialized in the theory of differential equations. Also, his book on set theory became a standard introduction to the field.

== Biography ==
Kamke was born in Marienburg, West Prussia, German Empire (modern Malbork, Poland).

After attending school in Stettin, Kamke studied mathematics and physics from 1909 at the University of Giessen and the University of Göttingen. He was a volunteer in the signals force in World War I. In 1919, he married Dora Heimowitch, who was the daughter of a Jewish businessman. He earned his doctorate in 1919 at the University of Göttingen under Edmund Landau with thesis Verallgemeinerungen des Waring-Hilbertschen Satzes (Generalizations of the Waring-Hilbert theorem). While teaching between 1920 and 1926, Kamke earned his habilitation at the University of Münster in 1922. He was appointed as a professor at the University of Tübingen in 1926.

Because of his marriage and his opposition to National Socialism, he was denounced by fellow mathematician Erich Schönhardt and eventually forced to retire in 1937.

Following World War II, he was reappointed as a professor at the University of Tübingen, and was instrumental in the organisation of a mathematical congress in Tübingen in autumn 1946, the first scientific congress in Germany after the war. In 1948, he re-established the German Mathematical Society, and was the chairman until 1952, when he became vice-president of the International Mathematical Union, which he remained until 1954.

He died in Rottenburg am Neckar from a heart attack.

== Works ==
- Theory of Sets, Dover Publications, Inc., New York, 1950
- Mengenlehre, Sammlung Göschen/Walter de Gruyter, Berlin 1928
- Das Lebesguesche Integral. Eine Einführung in die neuere Theorie der reellen Funktionen, B. G. Teubner, Leipzig 1925
- Differentialgleichungen reeller Funktionen, Akademische Verlagsgesellschaft, Leipzig 1930; ab der 4. (überarbeiteten) Auflage 1962 in zwei Bänden:
  - Band 1: Gewöhnliche Differentialgleichungen
  - Band 2: Partielle Differentialgleichungen
- Einführung in die Wahrscheinlichkeitstheorie, S. Hirzel, Leipzig 1932
- Differentialgleichungen. Lösungsmethoden und Lösungen I. Gewöhnliche Differentialgleichungen, Leipzig 1942
- Differentialgleichungen. Lösungsmethoden und Lösungen II. Partielle Differentialgleichungen 1. Ordnung für eine gesuchte Funktion, Leipzig 1944
- Das Lebesgue-Stieltjes-Integral, B. G. Teubner, Leipzig 1956
