= Max Simon (mathematician) =

German Jewish mathematician

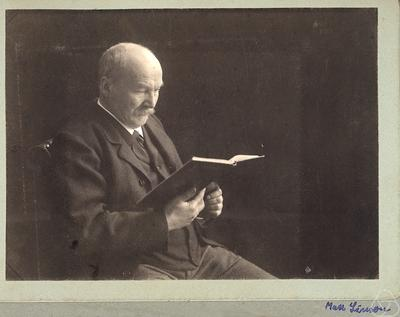
- From a photo album of the Mathematische Gesellschaft (Hamburg)
- Born: 8 June 1844; Kołobrzeg
- Died: 15 January 1918 (aged 73); Strasbourg
- Education: Friedrich Wilhelm University
- Scientific career
- Thesis: De relationibus inter constantes duarum linearum secundi ordinis, ut sit polygonum alteri inscriptum circumscriptum alteri (1867)
- Academic advisors: Karl Weierstrass, Ernst Eduard Kummer

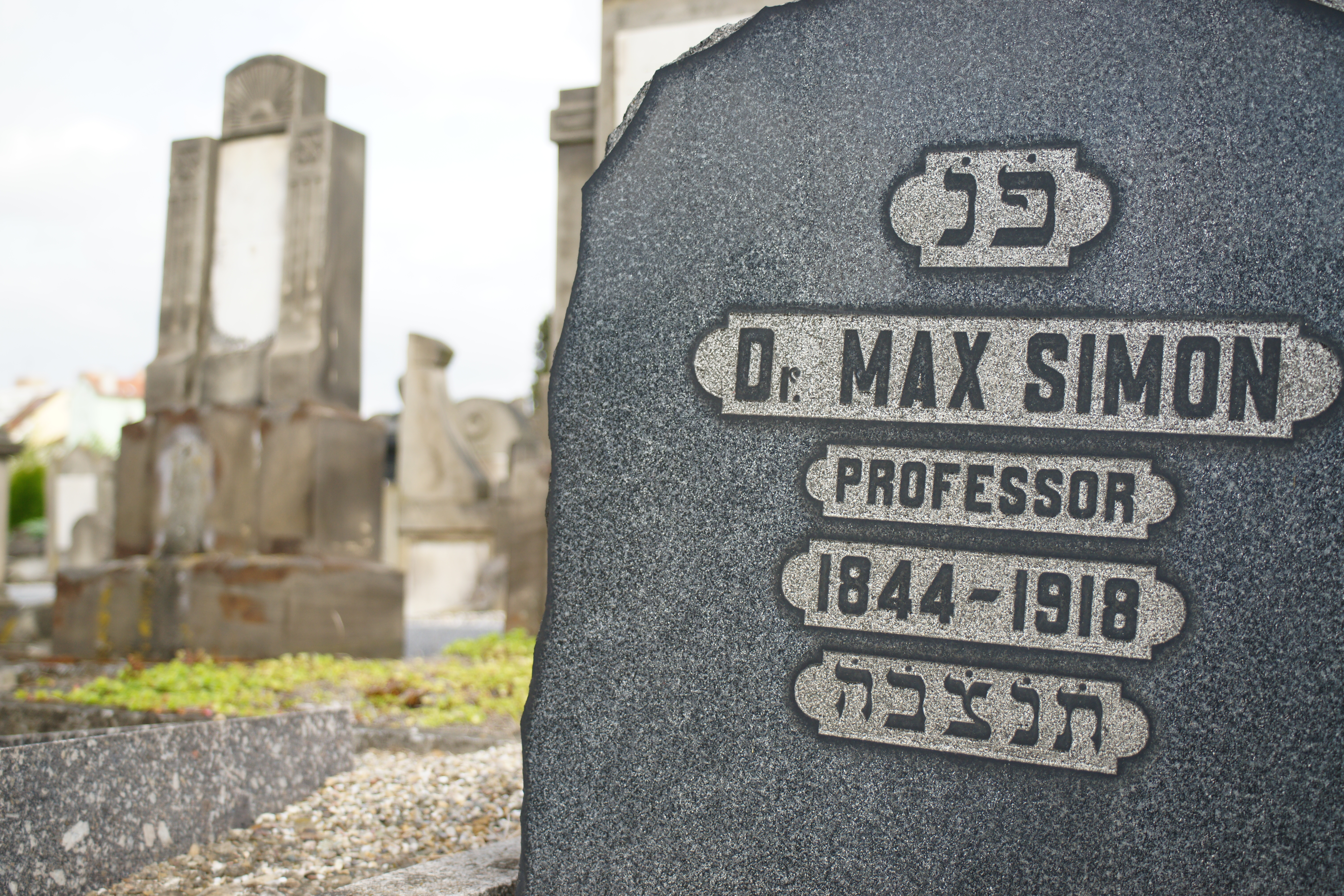
Gravestone of Max Simon

Maximilian Simon (born 8 June 1844 in Kołobrzeg; died 15 January 1918 in Strasbourg) was a German historian of mathematics and mathematics teacher. He was concerned mostly with mathematics in antiquity.

Born into a Jewish family, he studied from 1862 to 1866 at the Friedrich Wilhelm University of Berlin, obtaining his Ph.D. from Karl Weierstrass und Ernst Eduard Kummer He was a mathematics teacher in Berlin from 1868 to 1871, and in Strasbourg from 1871 to 1912, where he became an honorary professor of the university.

== Works ==
- Euclid und die sechs planimetrischen Bücher, Teubner 1901
- Über die Entwicklung der Elementargeometrie im 19 Jahrhundert, Bericht der Deutschen Mathematikervereinigung, Teubner 1906
- Geschichte der Mathematik im Altertum in Verbindung mit antiker Kulturgeschichte, Berlin: B. Cassirer 1909
- Nichteuklidische Geometrie in elementarer Behandlung (Kuno Fladt ed.), Teubner 1925
- Analytische Geometrie der Ebene, 3rd edition, Sammlung Göschen 1900
- Analytische Geometrie des Raumes, 2 volumes, Sammlung Göschen 1900, 1901
