= Karl Bobek =

German mathematician

Karl Joseph Bobek (1855–1899) was a German mathematician working on elliptic functions and geometry.
