= Stephan Luckhaus =

German mathematician

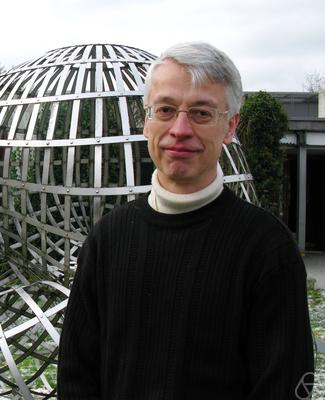
Luckhaus at Oberwolfach, 2009

Stephan Luckhaus is a German mathematician who is a professor at the University of Leipzig working in pure and applied analysis. His PhD was obtained in 1978 under the supervision of Willi Jäger at the University of Heidelberg. He was elected to the German Academy of Sciences Leopoldina in 2007.

== See also ==
- Richards equation
