= Hans Georg Bock =

German university professor for mathematics and scientific computing

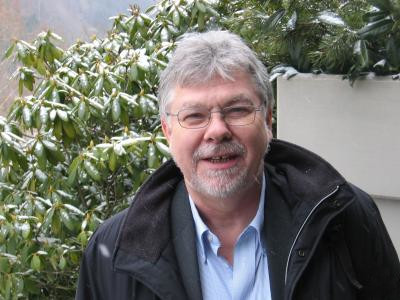
- Bock at the Workshop on Numerical Techniques for Optimization Problems with PDE Constraints, Oberwolfach, 2006
- Born: 9 May 1948 (age 78); Bottrop, Germany
- Education: University of Bonn
- Known for: Direct multiple shooting method Generalized Gauss–Newton method
- Awards: Honorary Doctorate of the Russian Academy of Sciences (2012) Medal of Honor, Gottlieb Daimler and Karl Benz Foundation (2008); Microsoft Research Award (2004); Medal of Merit, Ministry for Education and Training, Vietnam (2003); Honorary Doctorate of the Vietnamese Academy of Science and Technology (2000); GEFFRUB Award (1996); Heinrich Hörlein Memorial Award (1986) Felix Hausdorff Memorial Award (1984)
- Scientific career
- Fields: Mathematics; Scientific computing
- Workplaces: Heidelberg University; Interdisciplinary Center for Scientific Computing
- Doctoral advisor: Jens Frehse (mathematician); Roland Bulirsch (mathematician)

Hans Georg Bock (born 9 May 1948) is a German university professor for mathematics and scientific computing. He has served as managing director of Interdisciplinary Center for Scientific Computing of Heidelberg University from 2005 to 2017. Before this, he had been vice managing director from 1993 to 2004. Hans Georg Bock is a member of the European Mathematical Society's committee for developing countries (CDC-EMS) and responsible member for the region of Asia therein.

In appreciation of his merits with respect to Vietnamese-German relations and his role in the establishment of high performance scientific computing in Vietnam, he was awarded the honorary degree of the Vietnamese Academy of Science and Technology in 2000. In 2003, he was awarded the Medal of Merit of the Vietnamese Ministry for Education and Training.

== Academic profile ==
Hans Georg Bock graduated from University of Cologne in 1974 with a diploma thesis in mathematics titled "Numerische Optimierung zustandsbeschränkter parameterabhängiger Prozesse mit linear auftretender Steuerung unter Anwendung der Mehrzielmethode" (Numerical optimization of state-constrained parameter-dependent processes with linearly entering controls by application of the direct multiple shooting method) completed under the supervision of professor Roland Z. Bulirsch.

With his PhD thesis "Randwertproblemmethoden zur Parameteridentifizierung in Systemen nichtlinearer Differentialgleichungen" (Boundary-value problem methods for parameter estimation in systems of nonlinear differential equations) completed under the supervision of Jens Frehse and Roland Z. Bulirsch, he received a Ph.D. in applied mathematics from the University of Bonn in 1986.

After staying in Heidelberg for two years as a visiting professor for numerical mathematics from 1987 to 1988, he accepted a full professorship at the University of Augsburg. In 1991 Hans Georg Bock accepted a call onto the chair for scientific computing and optimization at Heidelberg University.

== Research ==
Hans Georg Bock authored or co-authored more than 190 scientific publications. In particular, his scientific work comprises advances in the fields of

- adaptive discretization and approximate Newton-type methods for large-scale optimization,
- simultaneous or one-shot methods for DAE and PDE constrained nonlinear optimization and optimal control problems,
- real-time computation of constrained closed-loop control problems subject to DAE and PDE, especially nonlinear model predictive control,
- numerical methods for state and parameter estimation, and optimal experimental design for DAE and PDE,
- numerical methods for differential algebraic equations (DAE),
- nonlinear mixed-integer dynamic optimization,
- optimization under uncertainty,
- non-standard optimization and optimal control problems such as stability optimization of gait patterns,
- computational methods for the cultural heritage, and
- applications in aerospace, mechanical and biomechanical engineering, chemical and process engineering, systems biology, and biomedicine.

== Teaching and supervision ==
Under the supervision of Hans Georg Bock, more than 70 diploma theses and more than 30 doctoral theses have been completed. Of his former PhD students, 15 received professorships from German and international higher education institutions.

Hans Georg Bock rendered outstanding services to the development of structured, internationally linked, and interdisciplinary doctoral programs by several innovations like the mentoring system in his positions as speaker of diverse research training groups of the Deutsche Forschungsgemeinschaft since 1992 and as director of the Heidelberg Graduate School of mathematical and computational methods for the sciences since November 2007.

== Particularities ==
- In honor of the 60th birthday of Hans Georg Bock and Rolf Rannacher, the MOSOCOP 08 conference was hosted in Heidelberg from July 21 to July 25, 2008.
- The direct multiple shooting method is often referred to as Bock's direct multiple shooting method.
