= Dwight Barkley =

British researcher

Dwight Barkley (born 7 January 1959) is an emeritus professor of mathematics at the University of Warwick.

== Education and career ==
Barkley obtained his PhD in physics from the University of Texas at Austin in 1988. He then spent one year at Caltech working with Philip Saffman followed by three years at Princeton University where he worked with Yannís Keverkidis and Steven Orszag. In 1992 he was awarded both NSF and NATO postdoctoral fellowships. In 1994 he joined the faculty at the University of Warwick. In 2026, he became emeritus professor at the University of Warwick.

== Research ==
Barkley studies waves in excitable media such as the Belousov–Zhabotinsky reaction, heart tissue, and neurons. He is the author of the Barkley Model of excitable media and discoverer of the role of Euclidean symmetry in spiral-wave dynamics.

In 1997, Laurette Tuckerman and Dwight Barkley coined the term "bifurcation analysis for time steppers" for techniques involving the modification of time-stepping computer codes to perform the tasks of bifurcation analysis. He has applied this approach in several areas of fluid dynamics, in particular to stability analysis of the cylinder wake and of the backward-facing step.

Barkley also works on the transition to turbulence in shear flows, including the formation of turbulent-laminar bands and the critical point for pipe flow. Exploiting an analogy with the transition between excitable and bistable media, Barkley derived a model for pipe flow which captures most features of transition to turbulence, in particular the behavior of turbulent regions called puffs and slugs.

He is also known for deriving an equation to estimate how long it will be until a child in a car asks the question "are we there yet?"

== Awards ==
In 2005 Barkley was awarded the J. D. Crawford Prize for outstanding research in nonlinear science, "for his development of high quality, robust and efficient numerical algorithms for pattern formation phenomena in spatially extended dynamical systems".

In 2008 he was elected Fellow of the American Physical Society "for combining computation and dynamical systems analyses to obtain remarkable insights into hydrodynamic instabilities and patterns in diverse systems, including flow past a cylinder, channel flow, laminar-turbulent bands, and thermal convection." That same year he was also elected fellow of the Institute of Mathematics and Its Applications.

In 2009–2010 he was a Royal Society–Leverhulme Trust Senior Research Fellow.

In 2016 he was elected Fellow of the Society for Industrial and Applied Mathematics "for innovative combinations of analysis and computation to obtain fundamental insights into complex dynamics of spatially extended systems."

In 2024, he was named a Fluids Mechanics Fellow of Euromech "for his profound contributions to transition to turbulence, nonlinear dynamics, pattern formation, hydrodynamic instabilities, and the Euler singularity through combination of large-scale computing with insightful dynamical systems analysis and modelling".

In 2026, he was elected a Fellow of the Royal Society.

== Selected publications ==
- Barkley, Dwight; Kness, Mark; Tuckerman, Laurette S. (1990), "Spiral-wave dynamics in a simple model of excitable media: the transition from simple to compound rotation", Physical Review A, Third Series, 42 (4): 2489–2491, Bibcode:1990PhRvA..42.2489B, doi:10.1103/PhysRevA.42.2489, MR 1068482, PMID 9904313.
- Barkley, Dwight (1991), "A model for fast computer simulation of waves in excitable media", Physica D: Nonlinear Phenomena, 49 (1–2): 61–70, Bibcode:1991PhyD...49...61B, doi:10.1016/0167-2789(91)90194-E.
- Barkley, Dwight (January 1994), "Euclidean symmetry and the dynamics of rotating spiral waves", Physical Review Letters, 72 (1): 164–167, Bibcode:1994PhRvL..72..164B, doi:10.1103/physrevlett.72.164, PMID 10055592.
- Barkley, Dwight; Henderson, Ronald D. (September 1996), "Three-dimensional Floquet stability analysis of the wake of a circular cylinder", Journal of Fluid Mechanics, 322: 215–241, Bibcode:1996JFM...322..215B, doi:10.1017/s0022112096002777, S2CID 53610776.
- Avila, K.; Moxey, D.; de Lozar, A.; Avila, M.; Barkley, D.; Hof, B. (July 2011), "The onset of turbulence in pipe flow", Science, 333 (6039): 192–196, Bibcode:2011Sci...333..192A, doi:10.1126/science.1203223, PMID 21737736, S2CID 22560587.
- Barkley, D. (2016), "Theoretical perspective on the route to turbulence in a pipe" (PDF), Journal of Fluid Mechanics, 803: P1, Bibcode:2016JFM...803P...1B, doi:10.1017/jfm.2016.465
