= Hubert Mara =

Austrian computer pioneer

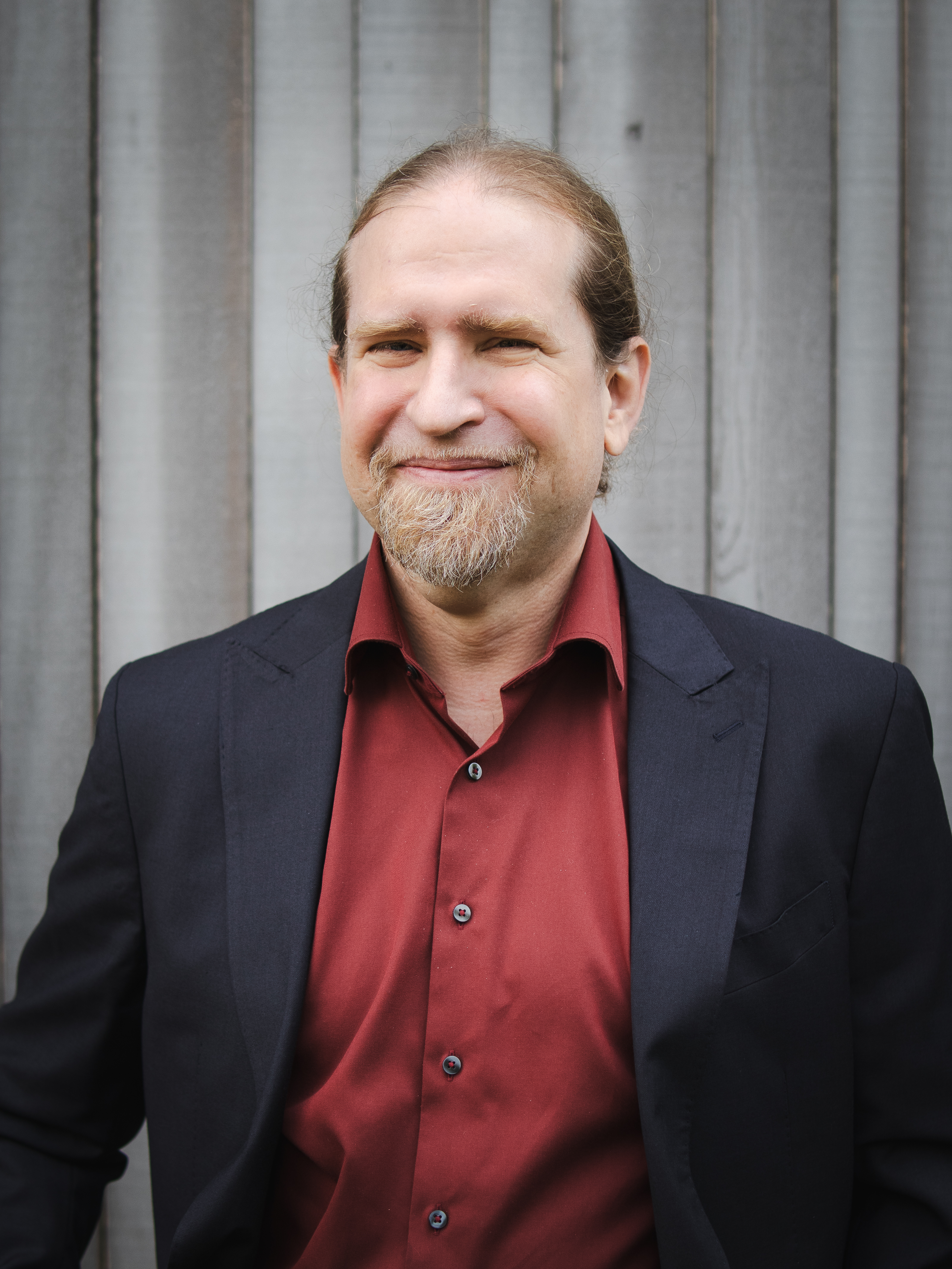
- Hubert Mara, 2024
- Born: Neunkirchen, Austria
- Education: Vienna University of Technology, Heidelberg University
- Known for: GigaMesh Software Framework
- Scientific career
- Fields: Computer Scientist
- Workplaces: Free University of Berlin

Hubert Mara is an Austrian Computer Scientist who specializes in Archaeoinformatics and the application of methods from computer science to the humanities, and thus a combination of these fields.

== Education and career ==
Hubert Mara graduated (matura) in electrical engineering from the HTBLuVA in Wiener Neustadt and studied computer science at the TU Wien, graduating in 2006. Already during his studies he participated in excavations in Israel and Peru, where he learned to combine methods of computer science and humanities. Early on, he participated in the development of new methods here, such as for 3D recording of ancient pottery for the Austrian Corpus Vasorum Antiquorum. After graduation, he received a Marie Curie Fellowship, with the help of which he went to the University of Florence, where he joined the Cultural Heritage Informatics Research Oriented Network (CHIRON) was involved in the development of the London Charter for the Computational Visualization of Cultural Heritage.

In 2009, Mara moved to the Interdisciplinary Center for Scientific Computing (IWR) at the Universität Heidelberg. In Heidelberg, his interdisciplinary doctorate was awarded in 2012, with Willi Jäger and Hans Georg Bock as reviewers. As part of the dissertation, he developed the GigaMesh Software Framework. This was a free and open source modular software for displaying, editing and visualizing 3D data. In practice, it is used to make things visible again that can no longer be captured with the normal human eye. Thus, it was now possible to make the writing on weathered gravestones legible again, to make fingerprints on archaeological ceramics visible, or to make damaged cuneiform texts legible again. He received his doctorate in 2012, after which Mara founded the Forensic Computational Geometry Laboratory (FCGL or FCGLab), also at Heidelberg University. He leads the FCGLab, which was funded as a junior research group by the Deutsche Forschungsgemeinschaft under the 2nd German Universities Excellence Initiative from 2014 to 2020. The group was dedicated to further projects on 3D computer vision, but also machine learning for archaeological finds. In 2014, he was offered a professorship at the University of Cologne without tenure track, which he declined. In Heidelberg, he had the doctoral right between 2014 and 2020, and was able to supervise three PhD students in the process. In 2020, they were awarded the European Heritage Award of the Europa Nostra in the field of research for their collaboration on the project Scanning for Syria. As of June 2020, Mara moved to the Mainz Centre for Digitality in the Humanities and Cultural Studies (mainzed) as executive director. Since 1. November 2021, Mara is a tenure-track-junior professor of eHumanities at the Institute of Computer Science at University of Halle. He is an Editor-in-Chief of the it - Information Technology journal series at De Gruyter, which is one of the oldest publication media of computer science in Germany. In 2023, he was offered professorships at the University of Augsburg and the FU Berlin. In 2024 rejected the offers from Augsburg and Halle and joined the Department for Department of History and Cultural Studies at FU Berlin as Professor for Archaeoinformatics.

== Research topics ==
Mara's main focus is on the connection of computer science with the humanities, especially archaeology. The core of his work is the development of new analysis, representation and research methods for archaeological finds, such as the age determination of 3D-captured cuneiform tablets with Artificial Intelligence as well as recognition of cuneiform signs. Starting with GigaMesh, he has done fundamental work in these areas. Since 2016, he has served on the advisory board of the German chapter of the Computer Applications and Quantitative Methods in Archaeology. Mara's publication list now includes a three-digit number of publications of various types and forms.
