= Rolf Rannacher =

German mathematician and professor

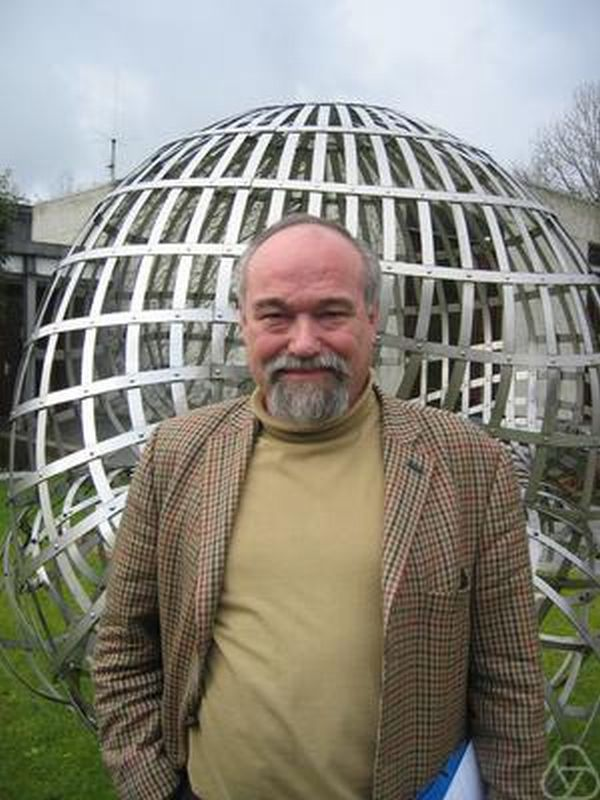
Rannacher at Oberwolfach, 2007

Rolf Rannacher (born 10 June 1948 in Leipzig) is a German mathematician and a professor of numerical analysis at Heidelberg University.

Rannacher studied mathematics and physics at the Goethe University Frankfurt. There he received his doctorate in 1974 with dissertation Diskrete Störungstheorie für das Punktsystem linearer Operatoren und Sesquilinearformen mit Anwendungen auf Operatoren vom Schrödinger Typ (Discrete perturbation theory for the point system of linear operators and sesquilinear forms with applications to operators of the Schrödinger type). From 1974 to 1980 he was an assistant to Jens Frehse at the University of Bonn, where he habilitated in 1978 and after habilitation spent a year at the University of Michigan. He was from 1980 to 1983 a professor at the University of Erlangen–Nuremberg and from 1983 to 1988 a professor at Saarland University. Since 1988 he is a professor in Heidelberg.

His research focuses on the numerical analysis of the finite element method (FEM) in partial differential equations (PDEs) based on functional analytic methods, for example, error estimation in the ${\mathcal L}^\infty$-norm for FEM approximation in elliptic boundary value problems. His research also deals with numerical fluid mechanics, including high-performance computer software development with his long-time collaborator John Haywood. In the 1990s Rannacher dealt with adaptive mesh refinement in solving optimal control problems, often in collaboration with Claes Johnson and Endre Süli. At Heidelberg's Interdisziplinären Zentrum für Wissenschaftliches Rechnen (acronym IWR, Interdisciplinary Center for Scientific Computing), Rannacher was, in the early 1990s, one of the pioneers in the development of parallel computer algorithms for transputers.

He was an Invited Speaker at the International Congress of Mathematicians (ICM) in Berlin in 1998 and at the ICM in Beijing in 2002. In 2009 he was made an honorary doctor of the University of Erlangen-Nuremberg.

== Selected publications ==
- with Wolfgang Bangerth: Adaptive finite element methods for differential equations, Birkhäuser 2003; 2013 pbk reprint
- as editor with Georg Bader, Gabriel Wittum: Numerische Algorithmen auf Transputer-Systemen, Teubner/Vieweg 1993; 2013 pbk reprint
- as editor with Willi Jäger, Jürgen Warnatz: Reactive Flows, Diffusion and Transport: From Experiments via Mathematical Modeling to Numerical Simulation and Optimization. Final Report SFB 359, Springer 2006 (The SFB # 359 was funded from 1993 to 2004.)
- as editor with others: Trends in PDE Constrained Optimization, Birkhäuser 2014
- as editor with others: Constrained Optimization and Optimal Control for Partial Differential Equations, Birkhäuser 2012
- as editor with Wolfgang Hackbusch: Numerical Treatment of the Navier-Stokes Equations (Notes on Numerical Fluid Mechanics), Vieweg 1990
- as editor with Guido Kanschat et al.: Numerical Methods in Multidimensional Radiative Transfer, Springer 2009
- as editor with Giovanni Galdi: Fundamental Trends in Fluid-Structure Interaction, World Scientific 2010
- as editor with Adélia Sequeida: Advances in Mathematical Fluid Mechanics: Dedicated to Giovanni Paolo Galdi on the Occasion of his 60th Birthday, Springer 2010
- as editor with Giovanni Galdi, Malcolm Heywood: Contributions to Current Challenges in Mathematical Fluid Mechanics, Birkhäuser 2004
- with Giovanni Galdi, Anne M. Robertson, Stefan Turek: Hemodynamical Flows: Modeling, Analysis and Simulation (Oberwolfach Seminars), Birkhäuser 2007
