= Ravindra K. Ahuja =

American computer scientist

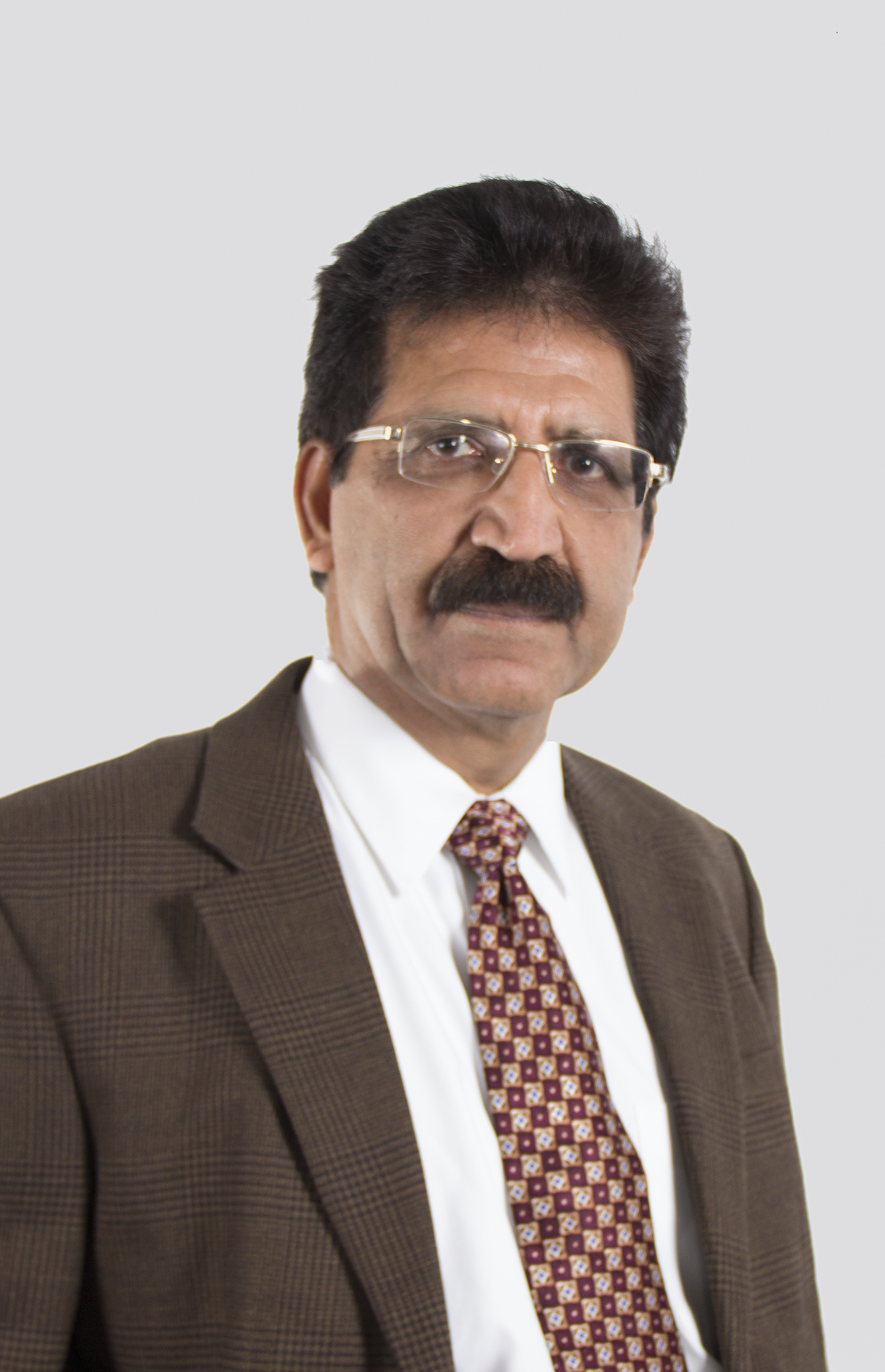
- Ravindra K. Ahuja
- Born: Ravindra K. Ahuja; February 20, 1956; Rampur, Uttar Pradesh, India
- Education: Indian Institute of Technology, Kanpur
- Occupations: Founder & CEO of Optym; Professor of Industrial and Systems Engineering at the University of Florida

Ravindra K. Ahuja (born February 20, 1956) is an Indian-born American computer scientist and entrepreneur. He is currently Professor of Industrial and Systems Engineering at the University of Florida in Gainesville, Florida, and CEO of the automation and optimization solutions provider Optym, which he founded in 2000 as Innovative Scheduling, Inc.

Ahuja specializes in mathematical modeling, state-of-the-art network optimization techniques and solving large-scale scheduling problems arising in logistics and transportation. He has developed models and algorithms for scheduling and logistics problems in airline, trucking and railroad industries worldwide. Many of these industry-specific problems were previously considered intractable. Ahuja’s optimization solutions are implemented by Optym’s advanced decision support systems.

Ahuja has provided scholarly contributions to the theory and applications of network optimization . He co-authored more than 100 research papers and book chapters in the areas of Industrial Engineering, Operations Research and Computer Science. He also co-authored three textbooks and served as associate editor of three journals: Operations Research, Transportation Science and Networks.

== Early life and education ==
Ravindra K. Ahuja was born in Rampur, Uttar Pradesh, India.

=== Indian Institute of Technology, Kanpur ===
In 1972, Ahuja entered the Indian Institute of Technology, Kanpur (IIT Kanpur), to study mechanical engineering. He earned a Bachelor of Science in mechanical engineering in 1977 and continued his education as a graduate student at his alma mater. Between 1977 and 1979, he studied maximal arc-disjoint and node-disjoint flow in multicommodity networks and earned a Master of Science in Industrial & Management Engineering. In 1982, he earned a Ph.D. in Industrial & Management Engineering (BB) for his work on the role of parametric programming in network flow problems.

== Career ==
=== Professor ===
Ahuja has held positions at several prestigious universities, including at the Massachusetts Institute of Technology (MIT) Sloan School of Management as Visiting Professor from 1986 to 1998, at the Rutgers University School of Management as Visiting Professor from 1996 to 1997 and at the Indian Institute of Technology, Kanpur (IIT Kanpur), in India as a faculty member from 1982 to 1996. Since 1998, Ahuja has served as Professor of Industrial and Systems Engineering at the University of Florida in Gainesville, Florida.

Throughout his academic career, Ahuja mentored several doctoral students and taught graduate and undergraduate courses, including Operations Research for Management, Introduction to Management Science, Introduction to Computing and Programming Languages, Network Flow Algorithms, Network Optimization, Combinatorial Optimization, Database Management Systems, Design of Production Systems and Operations Management.

Ahuja has contributed to the theory and applications of network optimization and specializes in network flows and network flow modeling. Specifically, Ahuja is a specialist in the domains of airline network planning, railroad planning and scheduling, less-than-truckload (LTL) optimization, pickup and delivery, network optimization, supply chain management and the modeling and optimization of large-scale logistics problems. He co-authored more than 100 research papers and book chapters in prestigious, peer-reviewed research journals. Ahuja founded the SCaLE (Supply Chain and Logistics Engineering) Center at the University of Florida, which encourages joint research and applied projects among faculty from Engineering, Computer Science and Business Administration in conjunction with industry participants.

=== Entrepreneur ===
While conducting research for transportation and logistics companies, Ahuja discovered a large discrepancy between academic theory and prevailing industry practices. He observed that advances taking place in optimization and computer science were not benefitting the transportation and logistics industry, which continued to use rudimentary techniques. Determined to change that, Ahuja founded Innovative Scheduling, Inc. in 2000, which changed its name to Optym in 2014, to bring the latest advances from academic theory into the business world.

Over the years, Ahuja has played a key role in Optym’s evolution from a local start-up to a global provider of automation and optimization solutions in the fields of transportation and logistics. As Founder & CEO of Optym, he works with colleagues to solve business problems, design algorithms and create user interfaces. He also performs consulting work and oversees new product development, partnership opportunities and business development initiatives.

=== Author ===
Ahuja co-authored three books: “Network Flows: Theory, Algorithms, and Applications”, first published in 1993; “Developing Spreadsheet-Based Decision Support Systems”, published in 2007, and “Developing Web-Enabled Decision Support Systems”, also published in 2007. The textbook “Network Flows: Theory, Algorithms, and Applications” has sold more than 20,000 copies.

== Awards and honors ==
- 1993: Frederick W. Lanchester Prize for best publication of the year in Operations Research and Management Science, INFORMS, “Network Flows: Theory, Algorithms, and Applications”
- 2003: Pierskalla Award for best paper in Health Applications of Operations Research, INFORMS, “A Column Generation Approach to Radiation Therapy Treatment Planning using Aperture Modulation”
- 2006: Daniel H. Wagner Award for Excellence in Operations Research Practice, INFORMS, “Solving Real-Life Railroad Blocking Problems”
- 2007: Koopman Prize for outstanding contribution to Military Operations Research, INFORMS, “Exact and Heuristic Algorithms for the Weapon-Target Assignment Problem”
- 2007: Finalist for the Innovations in Curriculum Award for his role in developing curriculum that would integrate information technology skills within the Industrial Engineering and Operations Research curriculum, Institute of Industrial Engineers (IIE)
- 2008: INFORMS Fellow Award for contributions to algorithmic research in network optimization, to the development of innovative methods in transportation scheduling and to the practice in the railroad industry
- 2010: Honorable Mention for the Transportation and Logistics Society Best Paper Competition, INFORMS
- 2013: Railway Application Section Distinguished Member Award, INFORMS
- 2015: Florida Governor's Business Ambassador Award
- 2017: Finalist for Ernst and Young Entrepreneur of the Year in the Florida region
