= Optym =

American transportation software company

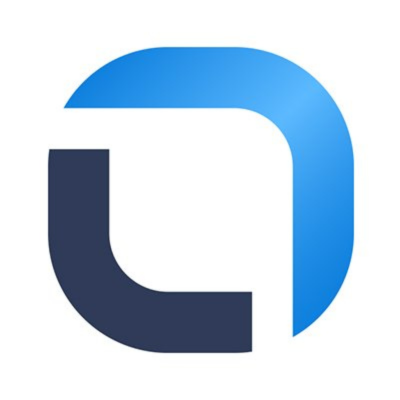

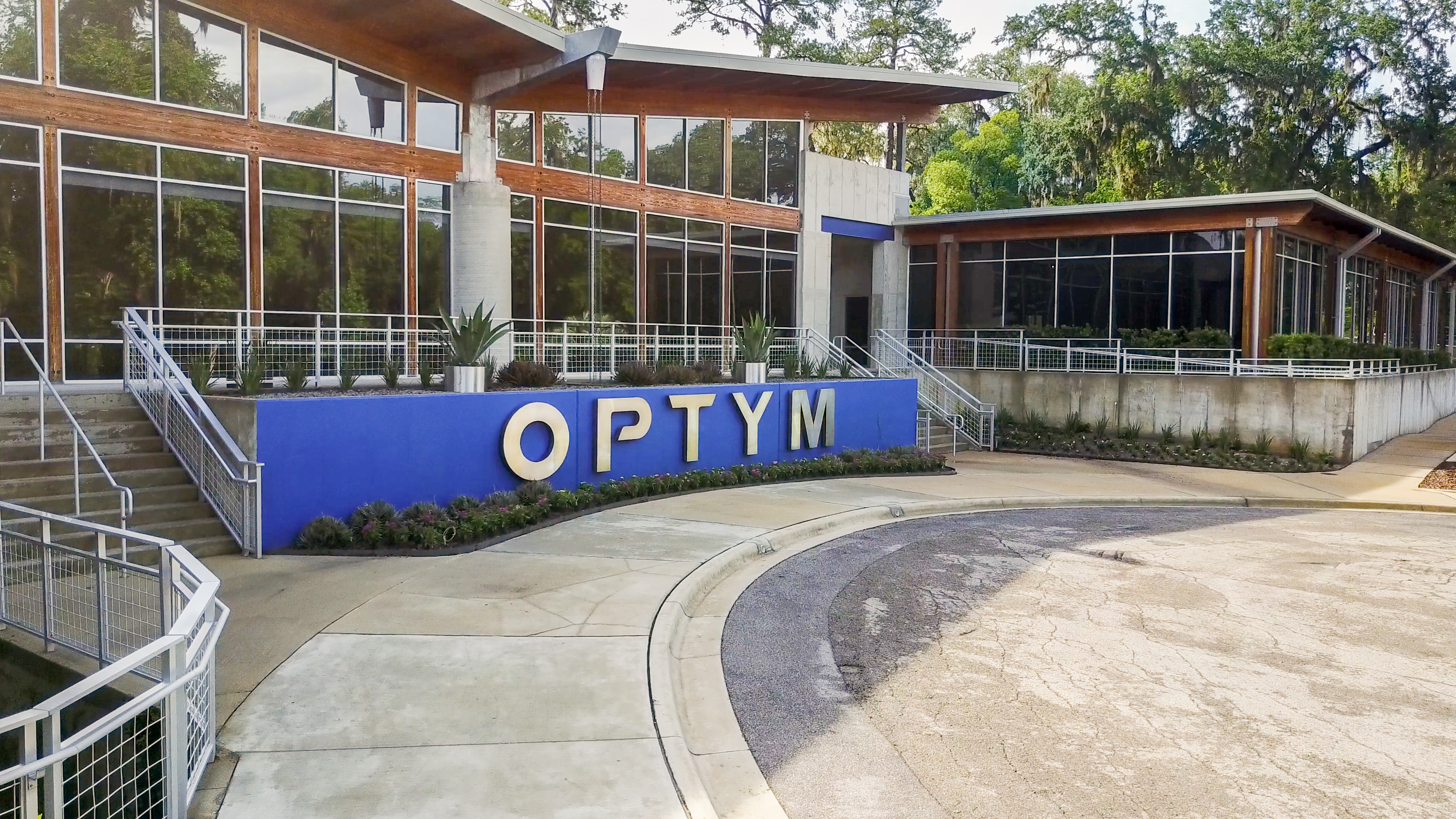
- Type: Private
- Industry: Software and Logistics
- Founded: 2000; 26 years ago (as Innovative Scheduling, Inc.); Gainesville, Florida
- Founder: Ravindra K. Ahuja
- Headquarters: Dallas, TX, USA
- Area served: Worldwide
- Key people: Krishna C. Jha; Arvind Kumar; Wei Huang
- Number of employees: 275+ (2024)
- Subsidiaries: Bangalore IN, Yerevan AM, Perth AU
- Website: https://optym.com/

Optym is a privately held company founded in 2000 by Dr. Ravindra K. Ahuja as Innovative Scheduling, Inc. The company headquarters is situated in Dallas, Texas with a development center located in Bangalore, India.

Optym provides transportation software and specializes in the optimization, simulation and analytics of transportation and logistics for railroad, trucking, airline and mining industries. The company clients include 5 of the top 10 LTL carriers and several other clients across railroad, air freight, and full-truckload, including Southwest Airlines, Komatsu, BNSF Railway, BHP, Norfolk Southern, Greyhound.

Optym was founded by researcher and academic Dr. Ravindra K. Ahuja in 2000 as Innovative Scheduling, Inc., which was rebranded as Optym in 2014.

Between 2004 and 2015, Optym was located at the Gainesville Technology Entrepreneurship Center (GTEC), a Santa Fe College-led business incubator. In 2015, the company moved its facility to the three-building Hillside Office Park off Tower Road to allow for rapid expansion and hiring.

== Financing ==
Optym obtained its first Small Business Innovation Research (SBIR) grant of $500,000 from the National Science Foundation (NSF) in 2004 to develop commercial software, specifically to build a decision support system addressing railroad blocking problems for CSX Transportation. It allowed Optym to hire its first set of full-time employees, including Krishna C. Jha, Wei Huang and Arvind Kumar, all of whom completed their Ph.D.s at the University of Florida under Ahuja's guidance.

In 2005, Optym received its Phase II SBIR grant to build a decision support system for train scheduling, and BNSF Railway provided a matching grant. These two grants, plus the licensing revenues from the product funded by the first NSF grant, provided continued funding for the research and development of optimization technologies for railroads. That year, Optym began building and commercializing its software and investing profits into the research and development of new products.

== Expansion ==
Optym's Armenia office opened in 2007 in the capital city of Yerevan with the goal of conducting research and development of innovative IT techniques. This allowed Optym to package optimization and simulation engines into desktop, web and map-based applications. The Armenia office currently has about 50 developers who specialize in databases, applications and UI development technologies.

Optym started its development center in Bangalore, India, in 2013 with intentions to benefit from a large talent pool of computer engineers in optimization, machine learning, data analytics, data warehousing and software architecture. This location gave Optym a regional base to accommodate its growing list of global customers.

In 2014, Optym's office in Perth, Australia, opened to serve local mining clients, including BHP.

In 2017, Optym expanded its headquarters facility in Gainesville, Florida, by an additional 10,000 square feet to accommodate a growing workforce and expanding slate of projects. Due to rapid growth, Optym doubled its Gainesville team from approximately 60 employees in 2014 to 120 employees in 2017.

In 2020, Optym moved its corporate headquarters to Dallas, Texas, but still maintains an active presence in Florida.

== Rebranding ==
Optym's current corporate identity is the result of a rebranding strategy initiated in 2014. Innovative Scheduling, Inc. changed its name to Optym (derived from the word “optimization”), supposedly to better reflect their expanding range of work, both in the products and services offered and the industries served. The rebranding effort also included a new logo and the new tagline, “Live Efficiently”.

== Corporate affairs ==
=== Expertise ===
Optym combines business intelligence—which includes harvesting big data, data visualization and advanced data analytics—with employees' industry-specific and technical knowledge in operations research, IT, data analytics, computer science and project management.

Application developers create desktop and web applications, as well as mobile applications for iOS, Android and Windows platforms.

A close relationship between Optym and the University of Florida has resulted in the company frequently hiring former undergraduate and graduate students as interns and full-time employees.

=== Leadership ===
Dr. Ravindra K. Ahuja is the founder and current CEO of Optym.

Dr. Krishna C. Jha is Executive Vice President of Optym and CEO of Optym Rail. Jha joined Ahuja in 2000 as his doctoral student and transitioned to working with Optym as one of the company's first team members in 2004. Jha focuses on the design and development of algorithms that solve problems in scheduling, transportation and logistics, such as train scheduling, railroad blocking and crew scheduling.

Dr. Wei Huang is Vice President of System Architecture at Optym and was one of Optym's first team members, having joined the company in 2004. He utilizes his academic experience to develop large-scale optimization models and guide Optym's software architecture.

Renzo Vaccari is Senior Vice President of Airline Solutions at Optym. He works closely with Southwest Airlines to develop and implement Amadeus SkyMAX and SkySYM by Optym.

Dr. Arvind Kumar is Optym's Managing Director (India Operations) and leads Optym's growth in the Asia-Pacific region. He works on Optym's core products to automate and optimize railroad and locomotive scheduling.

Dr. Arthur Ghulyan joined Optym in 2016 as Executive Director (Armenia Operations).

=== Convergence conference ===
Optym hosted its first invitation-only Convergence conference in February 2015, providing an opportunity for leaders in the transportation and logistics industries to exchange ideas, learn more about each other's challenges and discuss upcoming products. Sixty executives from major rail, airline and trucking companies met at Optym's Gainesville, Florida, headquarters to discuss how to increase efficiency within the transportation and logistics industries.

During the second Convergence conference in Orlando, Florida, in April 2016, 120 executives from 15 countries and 50 companies, including American Airlines, United Airlines, Southwest Airlines, JetBlue, Frontier Airlines, Spirit Airlines, Amazon.com freight, FedEx Freight, UPS Freight, BNSF Railway, CSX Transportation and Norfolk Southern Railway, met to discuss the conference's theme of Decision Automation.

The third Convergence conference was held in Miami, Florida, in September 2017, and focused on the theme of Decision Optimization.

=== Hackathon ===
Optym Armenia was the general sponsor and co-organizer of the Smarter Transportation Data Hackathon, which was a 24-hour event held in Yerevan, Armenia, on April 16, 2017.

=== Awards and recognition ===
Optym was one of two finalists for Best Tech Company at the Gainesville Area Chamber of Commerce's Business of the Year Awards in 2015.

== Products and services ==
=== Sky ===
Flight disruption is expected to become an increasingly expensive operational problem for airlines, airports and hotels to solve, motivating airline companies to invest in working with technology companies, such as Optym, to address disruption management.

In 2016, Optym and Amadeus IT Group entered into a long-term partnership to optimize Amadeus's flight scheduling, utilize its global network, technical sophistication and knowledge of the travel industry and unlock an additional 1–3% of current revenues, totalling millions of dollars.

Amadeus SKY Suite by Optym is the first system that optimizes flight times, fleet types, thru-flights and aircraft routings simultaneously instead of separately. The Amadeus SKY Suite by Optym consists of SkyMAX for flight schedule optimization and maximizing profitability, SkySYM for schedule reliability simulation and reduction of operational costs related to aircraft flows, passenger flows, maintenance activities, weather patterns, ATC events and crew and baggage delays, SkyPLAN for route frequency optimization and maximizing revenue generation, SkyCAST for network schedule forecasting and projecting profitability and SkyWORKS for schedule management and increasing efficiency.

In 2015, Southwest Airlines began testing SkyMAX and using SkySYM to strengthen the operational reliability of flight schedules in relation to on-time arrivals, schedule recoverability and passenger connections.

=== Rail ===
Optym received its first railroad project from CSX Transportation in 2004. It was tasked with optimizing locomotive planning function, and, in 2007, the collaboration resulted in the development of the real-time train scheduling system RailMAX. In addition to RailMAX, Rail by Optym consists of TrainMAX, CrewDESIGN, RailBIS, RailVIEWR, YardSYM, LocoMAX and YardMAX to automate decisions and simulate train movement, yard movement and locomotive assignment.

=== Haul ===
Optym entered the trucking industry in 2011 when it started research to solve less-than-truckload (LTL) linehaul planning problems, which are considered some of the most difficult optimization problems due to the physical and liability limitations inherent in serving residential customers.

Haul by Optym, consisting of HaulPLAN and HaulVIEWR, was developed to solve these problems and address the increased urgency caused by growth in the e-commerce fulfilment industry. Several top LTL carriers expressed interest in and eventually licensed Optym's load plan creation and network optimization software product HaulPLAN in 2016.

To improve performance and reduce costs, YRC Freight and its subsidiaries use the load plan software, and FedEx uses Optym's haul scheduling software

=== Urban ===
DriverMAX was released in early 2017 and is a collaboration between Optym and Greyhound Lines to produce software for driver route planning, which previously presented a significant efficiency challenge as it was done manually. The algorithm-based system incorporates human experience and insight to generate routes for over 1000 drivers in less than one hour. Use of DriverMAX is expected to increase drivers’ wages, improve drivers’ quality of life and reduce Greyhound's operational costs by several million dollars annually.
