= Bernold Fiedler =

German mathematician

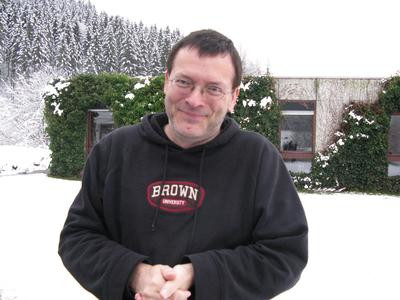
- Fiedler at Oberwolfach, 2008
- Born: 15 May 1956 (age 70)
- Education: Heidelberg University
- Scientific career
- Fields: Mathematics
- Workplaces: Free University of Berlin
- Thesis: Stabilitätswechsel und globale Hopf-Verzweigung (1982)
- Doctoral advisor: Willi Jäger
- Doctoral students: Björn Sandstede; Arnd Scheel

Bernold Fiedler (born 15 May 1956) is a German mathematician, specializing in nonlinear dynamics.

Fiedler received a Diploma from Heidelberg University in 1980 for his thesis Ein Räuber-Beute-System mit zwei time lags ("A predator-prey system with two time lags") and his doctorate with his thesis Stabilitätswechsel und globale Hopf-Verzweigung (Stability transformation and global Hopf bifurcation), written under the direction of Willi Jäger. Fiedler is a professor at the Institute for Mathematics of the Free University of Berlin.

His research includes, among other topics, global bifurcation, global attractors, and patterning in reaction-diffusion equations (an area of research pioneered by Alan Turing).

In 2008, Fiedler gave the Gauss Lecture with a talk titled "Aus Nichts wird nichts? Mathematik der Selbstorganisation". In 2002 he was, with Stefan Liebscher, an Invited Speaker at the ICM in Beijing, with a talk titled "Bifurcations without parameters: some ODE and PDE examples".

== Selected publications ==
=== Articles ===
- with S. B. Angenent: The dynamics of rotating waves in scalar reaction diffusion equations, Trans. Amer. Math. Soc. 307 (1988), 545–568 doi:10.1090/S0002-9947-1988-0940217-X
- with Peter Poláčik: "Complicated dynamics of scalar reaction diffusion equations with a nonlocal term." Proceedings of the Royal Society of Edinburgh Section A: Mathematics 115, no. 1–2 (1990): 167–192. doi:10.1017/S0308210500024641
- with Shui-Nee Chow and Bo Deng: "Homoclinic bifurcation at resonant eigenvalues." Journal of Dynamics and Differential Equations 2, no. 2 (1990): 177–244. doi:10.1007/BF01057418
- with Carlos Rocha: Orbit equivalence of global attractors of semilinear parabolic differential equations, Trans. Amer. Math. Soc. 352 (2000), 257–284 doi:10.1090/S0002-9947-99-02209-6
- Spatio-Temporal Dynamics of Reaction-Diffusion Patterns, in M. Kirkilionis, S. Krömker, R. Rannacher, F. Tomi (eds.) Trends in Nonlinear Analysis, Festschrift dedicated to Willi Jäger for his 60th birthday, Springer-Verlag, 2003, pp. 23–152. doi:10.1007/978-3-662-05281-5_2
- Romeo und Julia, spontane Musterbildung und Turings Instabilität, in Martin Aigner, Ehrhard Behrends (eds.) Alles Mathematik. Von Pythagoras zum CD Player, Vieweg, 3rd edition 2009 doi:10.1007/978-3-658-09990-9_7

=== Books ===
- Fiedler, Bernold; Scheurle, Jürgen (1996). Discretization of homoclinic orbits, rapid forcing, and "invisible chaos". Providence, RI: American Mathematical Society. ISBN 978-1-4704-0149-8. OCLC 851088509.
- Fiedler, Bernold (2001). Ergodic Theory, Analysis, and Efficient Simulation of Dynamical Systems. Berlin, Heidelberg: Springer Berlin Heidelberg. ISBN 978-3-642-56589-2. OCLC 840292245.
- Hasselblatt, Boris; Katok, A. B. (2002). Handbook of dynamical systems. Amsterdam: N.H. North Holland. ISBN 978-0-08-093226-2. OCLC 162578012.
- Fiedler, Bernold (1988). Global bifurcation of periodic solutions with symmetry. Berlin: Springer-Verlag. ISBN 978-3-540-39150-0. OCLC 294802397.
