= Jürgen Warnatz =

German physicist

- Born: 31 May 1944; Chemnitz, Germany
- Died: 22 December 2007 (aged 63); Neckarsteinach, Germany
- Citizenship: German
- Education: University of Göttingen
- Awards: Silver Combustion Medal; Philip Morris Research Award; Gottfried Wilhelm Leibniz Prize; Gerhard Damköhler Medal; A.K. Oppenheim Award
- Scientific career
- Fields: Physics; Combustion research
- Workplaces: University of Heidelberg: Interdisciplinary Center for Scientific Computing
- Doctoral advisor: Heinz Georg Wagner

Jürgen Warnatz (31 May 1944 in Chemnitz – 22 December 2007 in Neckarsteinach) was a German physicist. Between 1999 and 2004 he served as managing director of the Interdisciplinary Center for Scientific Computing (IWR) at Ruprecht Karls University of Heidelberg, Germany. From 2003 until his death he chaired the German Section of the Combustion Institute.

== Academic Profile ==
Jürgen Warnatz studied physics at Georg August University of Göttingen, Germany, and graduated in 1969. His diploma thesis was titled "Untersuchungen über die Reaktion von Stickstoffatomen mit Propin" (Studies of nitrogen atom reactions with propyne). In 1971, he finished his doctorate of physical chemistry at Göttingen University under Heinz Georg Wagner, having written his doctorate thesis on "Bestimmung der Geschwindigkeitskonstanten für Reaktionen von Fluoratomen in der Gasphase" (Identification of velocity constants for fluorine atom reactions in the gas phase). Between 1973 and 1982 he had a scientific staff position at Darmstadt University of Technology (Germany), School of Physical Chemistry and Chemical Technology. In the meantime, he finished his post-doctoral lecturing qualification in 1978 on "Berechnung der Flammengeschwindigkeit und der Struktur von laminaren Flammen" (Calculation of flame velocity and structure of laminar flames). Between 1982 and 1986, in 1987 and 1988, Jürgen Warnatz was professor at Heidelberg University, Germany. In 1989 he was appointed to the chair of the combustion group at Stuttgart University. From 1994 onwards he was back at Heidelberg University, professor and head of the reactive flows working group. Between 1999 and 2004 Jürgen Warnatz served as managing director of the Interdisciplinary Center for Scientific Computing. In 1997 he received the honorary doctorate of Trondheim University, Norway. On 11 September 2003 he was elected chair of the German Section of the Combustion Institute and held the chair until his death.

== Research ==
Jürgen Warnatz’ general research approach was modeling and simulation of chemical reactive flows, particularly looking at molecular reactions involved and transport processes. The main research priorities of his working group were:

- Combustion processes
- Hypersonic flows
- Heterogeneous catalysis
- Plasma reactions
- Fuel cells

== Publications (selection) ==
- J. Warnatz, Chemistry of Stationary and Non-Stationary Combustion, Chap. 12 in K. H. Ebert, P. Deuflhard, W. Jäger (Ed.), Modelling of Chemical Reaction Systems, Springer, ISBN 3-540-10983-8 (1981)
- N. Peters, J. Warnatz (Ed.), Numerical methods in laminar flame propagation, Vieweg, ISBN 3-528-08080-9 (1982)
- J. Warnatz, Rate Coefficients in the C/H/O System, Chap. 5 in W.C. Gardiner Jr., Combustion Chemistry, Springer, ISBN 0-387-90963-X (1984)
- J. Warnatz, W.Jäger (Ed.), Complex Chemical Reaction Systems, Springer, ISBN 3-540-18364-7 (1987)
- J. Warnatz, U. Maas, R. W. Dibble, Combustion, 4th ed., Springer, ISBN 978-3-540-67751-2 (2006)

== Prizes and awards ==
- Study grant of Karl-Winnacker-Foundation at Hoechst Inc. (1982)
- Silver Combustion Medal (1982)
- Philip Morris Research Award (1991)
- Gottfried Wilhelm Leibniz Prize (1993)
- Gerhard Damköhler Medal (1994)
- Awarded an honorary doctorate at The Norwegian University of Science and Technology (NTNU) (1997).
- A.K. Oppenheim Award (2001)
