= Björn Sandstede =

- Born: Hannover
- Citizenship: American
- Education: Heidelberg University; University of Stuttgart
- Awards: J.D. Crawford Prize
- Scientific career
- Fields: Mathematics
- Thesis: Verzweigungstheorie homokliner Verdopplungen (1993)
- Doctoral advisor: Bernold Fiedler

Björn Sandstede is a German applied mathematician. He is currently the Alumni-Alumnae University Professor of Applied Mathematics at Brown University, where he serves as chair of the department.

Sandstede earned his Dr. rer. nat. in 1993 from the University of Stuttgart, under the supervision of Bernold Fiedler.

In 2001 he was awarded the J.D. Crawford Prize of the Society for Industrial and Applied Mathematics for outstanding research in nonlinear science. In 2014 Sandstede was awarded the Jack K. Hale Award for his contributions to partial differential equations and the study of spiral waves in reaction diffusion systems. He was elected as a Fellow of the American Mathematical Society, in the 2025 class of fellows.
