= Arnd Scheel =

American mathematician (born 1966)

- Born: 1966 (age 59–60); Wissen, Germany
- Awards: J.D. Crawford Prize, 2009; SIAM Outstanding Paper Prize, 2000, 2007
- Scientific career
- Fields: Mathematics
- Workplaces: University of Minnesota

Arnd Scheel is a professor with the School of Mathematics at the University of Minnesota. Scheel earned his Ph.D. in 1994 from the Freie Universität Berlin under the supervision of Bernold Fiedler. In 2009 he was awarded the J.D. Crawford Prize of the Society for Industrial and Applied Mathematics for outstanding research in nonlinear science. In 2016 he received the Humboldt Research Award and was named a SIAM Fellow for contributions to applied dynamical systems and the study of pattern formation.

== Education ==
Scheel attended the University of Heidelberg 1987-1990 and graduated with a DEA from the Institut Nonlineaire de Nice in 1991. After graduate studies in Stuttgart and Berlin, he received his PhD from the FU Berlin in 1994. He was an assistant professor at FU Berlin until 2001, when he received his Habilitation. Since 2001 he has worked in the School of Mathematics at the University of Minnesota.

== Research ==
Scheel's research is concerned with patterns and waves in spatially extended dynamical systems. His results include existence, stability, and bifurcation results for coherent structures such as wave trains, invasion fronts, pattern forming fronts, defects in oscillatory media, spiral waves, or defects in striped phases such as grain boundaries and dislocations.
