= Georgi Manev =

Georgi Ivanov Manev Георги Иванов Манев
- Born: 15 January 1884; Veliko Tarnovo, Principality of Bulgaria
- Died: 15 July 1965 (aged 81); Sofia, People's Republic of Bulgaria
- Education: University of Sofia
- Known for: Manev field
- Children: Angel Manev; Fannie Maneva
- Scientific career
- Fields: Classical and celestial mechanics
- Workplaces: University of Sofia

55th Minister of Public Education (Bulgaria)
- In office 24 January 1938 – 14 November 1938
- Prime Minister: Georgi Kyoseivanov
- Preceded by: Nikolay Nikolaev
- Succeeded by: Bogdan Filov

31st Rector of Sofia University "St. Kliment Ohridski"
- In office 1936–1937
- Preceded by: Michail Arnaudov
- Succeeded by: Georgi Genov

Georgi Manev (Bulgarian: Георги Манев) (15 January 1884 – 15 July 1965) was a Bulgarian physicist, founder of the Sofia University Department of Theoretical Physics, rector of Sofia University (1936–37) and education minister of Bulgaria (1938). His work, mostly known as the Manev field, is used today in aerospace science.

The articles he published in the 1920s have been noticed by Yusuke Hagihara and have been further analysed by Florin Diacu and co-workers.

== Letter from Albert Einstein ==
Manev's gravitational theory ran counter to Albert Einstein’s theory of relativity. Einstein's less-than-glowing assessment of Manev’s theory had complicated his colleague’s prospects for a full professorship at Sofia University. In July 1929, Einstein wrote an apologetic letter to Manev, offering to help make the situation “good again.”

The typewritten letter, signed “A. Einstein,” belongs to Manev's family and was subject of an art restoration project at the Winterthur/University of Delaware Program in Art Conservation (WUDPAC). The letter was creased, partly from being folded, mailed, and tucked into a book for safekeeping during World War II. The creases were retained, removing the adhesive tape without damaging the typed words on the paper.
