= Křelovice (Plzeň-North District) =

- Municipality
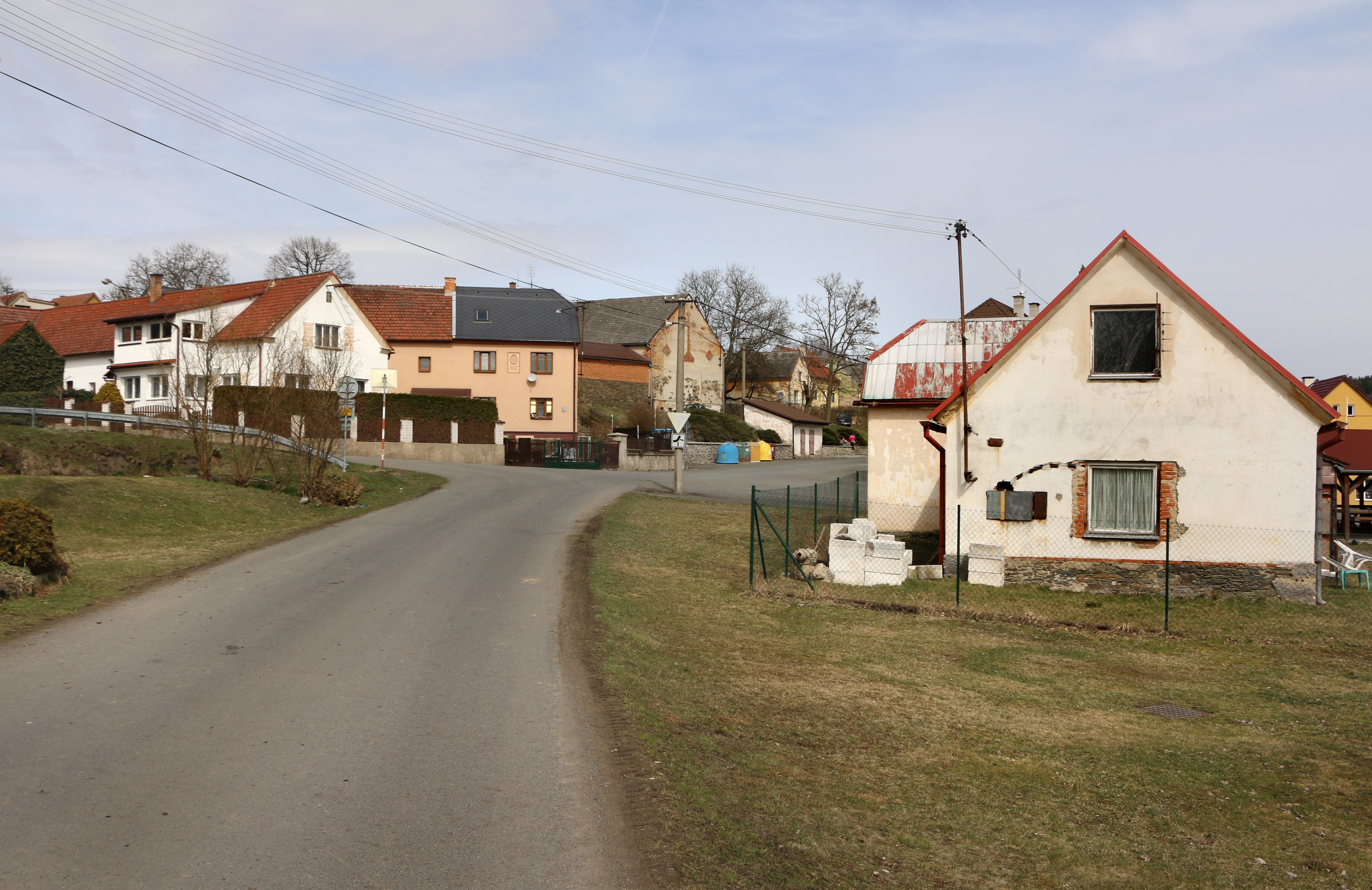
- Road in Křelovice

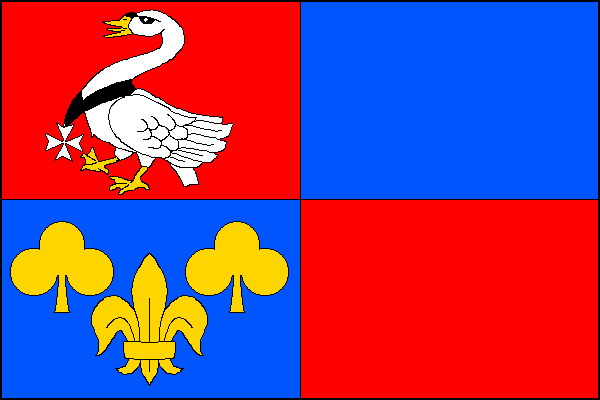
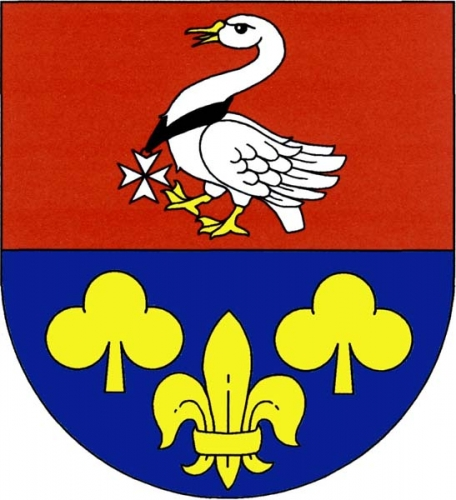
- Flag Coat of arms

- Location in the Czech Republic
- Coordinates: 49°52′28″N 13°4′33″E
- Country: Czech Republic
- Region: Plzeň
- District: Plzeň-North
- First mentioned: 1483

Area
  - Total: 21.11 km^{2} (8.15 sq mi)
- Elevation: 515 m (1,690 ft)

Population (2026-01-01)
  - Total: 227
  - Density: 10.8/km^{2} (27.9/sq mi)
- Time zone: UTC+1 (CET)
  - Summer (DST): UTC+2 (CEST)
- Postal code: 330 36
- Website: www.obeckrelovice.cz

Křelovice (German: Kschellowitz) is a municipality and village in Plzeň-North District in the Plzeň Region of the Czech Republic. It has about 200 inhabitants.

Křelovice lies approximately 26 kilometres (16 mi) north-west of Plzeň and 99 km (62 mi) west of Prague.

== Administrative division ==
Křelovice consists of four municipal parts (in brackets population according to the 2021 census):

- Křelovice (163)
- Mydlovary (14)
- Pakoslav (26)
- Rozněvice (20)

== Demographics ==
Historical population
Year	Pop.	±%
1869	771	—
1880	774	+0.4%
1890	790	+2.1%
1900	808	+2.3%
1910	813	+0.6%
1921	781	−3.9%
1930	732	−6.3%
1950	329	−55.1%
1961	292	−11.2%
1970	278	−4.8%
1980	263	−5.4%
1991	227	−13.7%
2001	222	−2.2%
2011	207	−6.8%
2021	223	+7.7%
Source: Censuses

== Notable people ==
- Willi Jäger (born 1940), German mathematician
