= John David Crawford =

American physicist and professor (1954–1998)

- Born: 1954
- Died: August 23, 1998 (aged 43–44); Pittsburgh, Pennsylvania, US
- Occupation(s): Physicist, professor
- Years active: 1977–1998?
- Employer: University of Pittsburgh
- Known for: Research in theoretical physics

John David Crawford (1954–1998) was an American physicist and professor at the University of Pittsburgh. He obtained his undergraduate degree with honors from Princeton University in 1977 and his Ph.D. from the University of California, Berkeley in 1983.

An internationally recognized researcher in theoretical physics, he specialized in plasma physics and nonlinear dynamics. His broad physical insight and deep knowledge of mathematics enabled him to make profound contributions to dynamical systems. He published more than 80 research papers and wrote a landmark review on bifurcation theory. Additionally, he was also a codirector of the "Research Experiences for Undergraduates" program, which exposed undergraduates to scientific study, in 1997.

Apart from his research, he was a passionate mountain climber. He died on August 23, 1998, at the Montefiore Hospital in Pittsburgh of Burkitt's lymphoma, a form of lymph cancer.

In 2001, SIAM's Activity Group in Dynamical Systems established the J.D. Crawford Prize, which is now the world's top award in dynamical systems.
