= Igor Mezić =

American mechanical engineer and mathematician

Igor Mezic
- Born: 1967 (age 58–59); Rijeka, Croatia
- Citizenship: American
- Awards: Sloan Fellow (1999), APS Fellow (2016), SIAM Fellow (2017), J. D. Crawford Prize (2021)

Igor Mezić is a mechanical engineer, mathematician, Mosher Endowed Chair and Distinguished Professor of mechanical engineering and mathematics at the University of California, Santa Barbara. He is best known for his contributions to operator theoretic, data driven approach to dynamical systems theory that he advanced via articles based on Koopman operator theory, and his work on theory of mixing, that culminated in work on microfluidic mixer design, and mapping oil refuse from the Deepwater Horizon oil spill in the Gulf of Mexico to aid in cleaning efforts.

He graduated from the Mechanical Engineering Department at University of Rijeka, Croatia in 1990, with a Diploma in Engineering, and got the Ph.D. degree from the California Institute of Technology (Caltech), within the Applied Mechanics program, with a thesis in Dynamical Systems Theory, in 1994, under supervision of Stephen R. Wiggins.

Mezić was a postdoctoral fellow at the Mathematics Institute of the University of Warwick in the United Kingdom from 1994 to 1995 and joined the Mechanical Engineering Faculty at the University of California, Santa Barbara, in 1995. He moved to the Division of Engineering and Applied Sciences at Harvard University in 2000 before returning to University of California, Santa Barbara, where he became a Full Professor in 2003.

Mezić has received numerous awards and honors for his research work in fields of physics, mathematics (Sloan Fellowship) and engineering. In 2015, he was elected a Fellow of the American Physical Society, for "fundamental contributions to the theory of three-dimensional chaotic advection, measures and control of mixing, and development of a spectral operator theory approach to decomposition of complex fluid flows". He was elected as a Fellow of the Society for Industrial and Applied Mathematics in 2017 (SIAM Fellow), "for sustained innovation at the dynamical systems theory/applications interface; notably for advances in the use of Koopman operator theory". In 2022, Mezić was elected a Fellow of the Institute of Electrical and Electronics Engineers (IEEE) for contributions to modeling and control using Koopman operator techniques. In 2019, Mezic was inaugurated as the first ever Honoris Professor at his alma mater, University of Rijeka, Croatia. He is the recipient of the 2021 J. D. Crawford Prize, a biennial award presented by the Society for Industrial and Applied Mathematics (SIAM) for achievements in the field of dynamical systems.

Mezić is a holder of 10 US patents. Four technology companies – in the Internet of things, Ecorithm (now Pametan); medical diagnostics, iFluidics; artificial intelligence, Aimdyn; and network security, Mixmode – were founded on the basis of his patents and algorithms. Mezić continues his scientific work as director of the Center for Energy Efficient Design and a professor at the Departments of Mechanical Engineering and Mathematics at the University of California, Santa Barbara.

Mezić is currently involved in DARPA projects coupling his developments in operator theory, machine learning and artificial intelligence. He is applying this methodology in commercial developments in network security and Internet of things domains.

== Books ==
- Luca Cortelezzi (ed.), Igor Mezić (ed.): Analysis and Control of Mixing with an Application to Micro and Macro Flow Processes. Springer, 2009
- Petros Koumoutsakos (ed.), Igor Mezić (ed.): Control of Fluid Flow. Springer 2010
- Alexandre Mauroy (ed.), Igor Mezić (ed.), & Yoshihiko Susuki (ed.). The Koopman Operator in Systems and Control: Theory, Numerics, and Applications. Springer 2019.
