= J. D. Crawford Prize =

The J. D. Crawford Prize is a biennial award presented by the Society for Industrial and Applied Mathematics (SIAM) for achievements in the field of dynamical systems. Established in 2001, the award honors John David Crawford (1954–1998), a professor at the University of Pittsburgh who made fundamental research contributions in the field.

== Recipients ==
The recipients of the J. D. Crawford prize are:

- Björn Sandstede (2001)
- Yannís G. Kevrekidis (2003)
- Dwight Barkley (2005)
- Andrew M. Stuart (2007)
- Arnd Scheel (2009)
- Eric Vanden-Eijnden (2011)
- Panayotis G. Kevrekidis (2013)
- Florin Diacu (2015)
- Martin Wechselberger (2017)
- Margaret Beck (2019)
- Igor Mezić (2021)
- Victoria Booth (2023)
- Gary Froyland (2025)

== See also ==
- List of mathematics awards
- Prizes named after people
