= Florin Diacu =

Romanian-born Canadian mathematician

- Born: April 24, 1959; Sibiu, Romania
- Died: February 13, 2018 (aged 58); Victoria, British Columbia, Canada
- Education: University of Bucharest; Heidelberg University
- Awards: J.D. Crawford Prize
- Scientific career
- Fields: Mathematics
- Workplaces: University of Victoria; Yale-NUS College
- Doctoral advisor: Willi Jäger

Florin Nicolae Diacu (Romanian pronunciation: [diaku]; April 24, 1959 – February 13, 2018) was a Romanian Canadian mathematician and author.

== Education and career ==
He graduated with a Diploma in Mathematics from the University of Bucharest in 1983. Between 1983 and 1988 he worked as a math teacher in Mediaș. In 1989 he obtained his doctoral degree at the Heidelberg University in Germany with a thesis in celestial mechanics written under the direction of Willi Jäger.

After a visiting position at the University of Dortmund, Diacu immigrated to Canada, where he became a post-doctoral fellow at Centre de Recherches Mathématiques (CRM) in Montreal. Since 1991, he was a professor at the University of Victoria in British Columbia, where he was the director of the Pacific Institute for the Mathematical Sciences (PIMS) between 1999 and 2003. In 2017 he became a Professor and Head of Studies of Mathematical, Computational & Statistical Sciences at Yale-NUS College in Singapore. He also held short-term visiting positions at the Victoria University of Wellington, New Zealand (1993), University of Bucharest, Romania (1998), University of Pernambuco in Recife, Brazil (1999), and the Bernoulli Center at École Polytechnique Fédérale de Lausanne, Switzerland (2004).

== Research ==
Diacu's research was focused on qualitative aspects of the n-body problem of celestial mechanics. In the early 1990s he proposed the study of Georgi Manev's gravitational law, given by a small perturbation of Newton's law of universal gravitation, in the general context of (what he called) quasihomogeneous potentials. In several papers, written alone or in collaboration, he showed that Manev's law, which provides a classical explanation of the perihelion advance of Mercury, is a bordering case between two large classes of attraction laws. Several experts followed this research direction, in which more than 100 papers have been published to this day.

Diacu also obtained some important results on a conjecture due to Donald G. Saari, which states that every solution of the n-body problem with constant moment of inertia is a relative equilibrium.

Diacu's later research interests regarded the n-body problem in spaces of constant curvature. For the case $n=2$, this problem was independently proposed by János Bolyai and Nikolai Lobachevsky, the founders of hyperbolic geometry. But though many papers were written on this subject, the equations of motion for any number, n, of bodies were obtained only in 2008. These equations provide a new criterion for determining the geometrical nature of the physical space. For example, should some orbits be proved to exist only in, say, Euclidean space, but not in elliptic and hyperbolic space, and if they can be found through astronomical observations, then space must be Euclidean.

In 2015 Diacu was presented with the J. D. Crawford Prize from SIAM, awarded for outstanding research in nonlinear science, "for the novel approach to the n-body problem in curved space, blending dynamical systems, differential geometry, and geometric and celestial mechanics in a lucid, inspirational manner."

== Books ==
Apart from his mathematics research, Diacu was also an author of several successful books. He wrote a monograph about celestial mechanics and a textbook of differential equations. The students at the University of Victoria signed a petition against the textbook that Dr. Diacu had written. The students asked the university administration to permanently withdraw the textbook from the course. Lately he became interested in conveying complex scientific and scholarly ideas to the general public. His most successful books in this sense are:

- Celestial Encounters: The Origins of Chaos and Stability, co-authored with Philip Holmes, Princeton University Press (1996), (ISBN 0-691-00545-1). It won the Best Academic Book Award of 1997. and was translated into Chinese, Greek, Hungarian, Japanese, Romanian, and Russian. This book is a history of ideas tracing the birth and development of chaos theory.
- The Lost Millennium: History's Timetables Under Siege, Knopf Canada (2005) (ISBN 0-676-97657-3), is a treatment of the problems of historical chronology (otherwise known as the phantom time conspiracy theory). The author discusses how historical events were dated and presents the objections brought to the traditional approach by Isaac Newton, Anatoly Fomenko and other scientists and mathematicians. A modified Romanian version appeared in 2009.
- Megadisasters: The Science of Predicting the Next Catastrophe, Princeton University Press (2009) (ISBN 0-691-13350-6) and Oxford University Press (2009) (ISBN 978-0-19-923778-4), traces the history of the scientific efforts made to predict and minimize the damage resulting from major catastrophes, such as tsunamis, earthquakes, volcanic eruptions, rapid climate change, hurricanes, collisions with asteroids or comets, stock-market crashes, and pandemics. This book also won "Best Academic Book Award" of 2011. From the citation: "[Florin] Diacu (Univ. of Victoria, Canada) is a mathematician who uses his professional and outstanding literary skills to provide a remarkable analysis of the 'science' of prediction. His chapter topics range from tsunamis, earthquakes, volcanic eruptions, and cosmic impacts to financial crashes and pandemics. Perhaps the most remarkable chapter deals with climate change. All these subjects are highly germane to the present world society awash with levels of communication hardly envisaged 10 or 20 years ago. Diacu's great depth of historical knowledge, penetrating insights, and familiarity with the associated literature has led to an erudite yet easily readable approach that retains critical scientific impact. In an age where the news media and large sections of society seem to feast on dire predictions and the threat of many 'imminent' disasters, Megadisasters should be required reading for all intelligent human beings. Summing Up: Highly recommended. All levels/libraries."
