= Eric Vanden-Eijnden =

Eric Vanden-Eijnden is a professor of mathematics at the Courant Institute of Mathematical Sciences, New York University. Vanden-Eijnden earned his doctorate in 1997 from the Université libre de Bruxelles under the supervision of Radu Bălescu. In 2009 he was awarded the Germund Dahlquist Prize of the Society for Industrial and Applied Mathematics "for his work in developing mathematical tools and numerical methods for the analysis of dynamical systems that are both stochastic and multiscale", and in 2011 he won SIAM's J.D. Crawford Prize for outstanding research in nonlinear science.
