= Erhard Heinz =

German mathematician

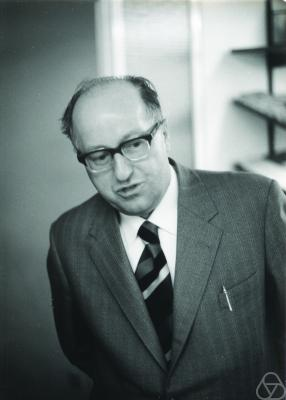
Erhard Heinz

Erhard Heinz (30 April 1924, Bautzen – 29 December 2017, Göttingen) was a German mathematician known for his work on partial differential equations, in particular the Monge–Ampère equation. He worked as professor in Stanford, Munich and from 1966 until his retirement 1992 at the University of Göttingen.

Heinz obtained his PhD in 1951 under the supervision of Franz Rellich at the University of Göttingen.

His most important scientific work deals with the existence and regularity theory of systems of non-linear partial differential equations, with applications to differential geometry and mathematical physics. He obtained important results in the theory of surfaces with prescribed mean curvature, in particular of minimal surfaces, for the Weyl embedding problem, and for systems of Monge-Ampère type.

In 1994 he was awarded the Cantor medal. His doctoral students include Hans Wilhelm Alt, Wolf von Wahl, Willi Jäger, Helmut Werner, Reinhold Böhme, Friedrich Tomi, and Friedrich Sauvigny.

== Literature ==
- Robert Schaback: Nachruf auf Erhard Heinz 30. April 1924 – 29. Dezember 2017. In: Jahrbuch der Akademie der Wissenschaften zu Göttingen 2018. Universitätsverlag Göttingen, Göttingen 2020, S. 93–102 (online).
- Willi Jäger, Friedrich Sauvigny: Professor Dr. Dr.h.c. Erhard Heinz (1924–2017) in Memoriam. In: Jahresbericht der Deutschen Mathematiker-Vereinigung 122 (2020), S. 3–33.
