= Journal of Mathematical Fluid Mechanics =

Scientific journal

- Discipline: Fluid dynamics
- Language: English
- Edited by: Giovanni Paolo Galdi

Publication details
- History: 1999—present
- Publisher: Springer
- Frequency: Quarterly
- Impact factor: 1.5 (2025)

Standard abbreviations
- ISO 4: J. Math. Fluid Mech.

Indexing
- ISSN: 1422-6928 (print); 1422-6952 (web)

Links
- Journal homepage; Online access; Online archive

Journal of Mathematical Fluid Mechanics is a peer-reviewed scientific journal published quarterly by Springer Science+Business Media. Established in 1999, it covers mathematical theory of fluid dynamics with a focus on Navier–Stokes equations. Its current editor-in-chief is Giovanni Paolo Galdi (University of Pittsburgh).

== Abstracting and indexing ==
The journal is abstracted and indexed in:

- Current Contents/Physical, Chemical & Earth Sciences
- EBSCO databases
- Ei Compendex
- GEOBASE
- Inspec
- MathSciNet
- ProQuest databases
- Science Citation Index Expanded
- Scopus
- zbMATH

According to the Journal Citation Reports, the journal has a 2025 impact factor of 1.5.
