= Generalized Gauss–Newton method =

Generalization of a statistical algorithm

The generalized Gauss–Newton method is a generalization of the least-squares method originally described by Carl Friedrich Gauss and of Newton's method due to Isaac Newton to the case of constrained nonlinear least-squares problems.
