= Willi Jäger =

German mathematician (born 1940)

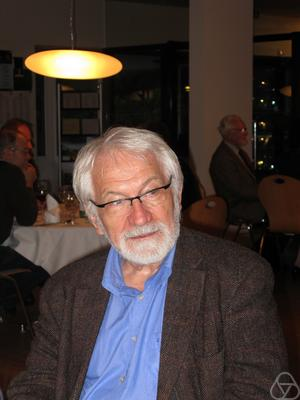
Jäger at Oberwolfach, 2010

Willi Jäger (born 15 August 1940 in Kschellowitz, Bohemia) is a German mathematician.

== Education ==
He completed his PhD in 1966 at LMU Munich under the direction of Erhard Heinz.

== Career ==
From 1969 to 1970, Jäger was a visiting scientist at the Courant Institute in New York City. In 1970, he became professor of mathematics at the University of Münster and in 1974, he became professor of applied mathematics at Heidelberg University. In 1987, Jäger was founding member of the Interdisciplinary Center for Scientific Computing of Heidelberg University. He is a board member of the Mathematical Research Institute of Oberwolfach.

In addition to problems of scientific computing, including the effective use of computers for the mathematical modeling of complicated, mostly scientific problems, Jäger deals with problems of nonlinear differential equations, calculus of variations, branching processes, and the spectral theory of differential operators, mostly with a view to specific applications such as data visualization.

Jäger had more than 100 PhD students, including Florin Diacu, Bernold Fiedler, Stephan Luckhaus, Hubert Mara and Martin Vingron.

== Awards and honors ==
Thus far, he has been honoured with 2 honorary doctorates, several prizes and the Order of Merit of the Federal Republic of Germany. He gave a DMV Gauss Lecture in 2007.
