= Yannís G. Kevrekidis =

Bloomberg Chair Yannis G. Kevrekidis
- Born: 1959 (age 66–67); Greece
- Education: National Technical University of Athens (Dipl. Chem. Eng., 1981); University of Minnesota (MA, 1986, Ph.D., 1987)
- Known for: Modeling of Complex Systems; Reaction Engineering; Algorithms
- Awards: American Academy of Arts & Sciences (2017), J.S. Guggenheim Fellow (2005), Packard Foundation Fellowship (1988)
- Scientific career
- Fields: Chemical Engineering; Mathematics
- Workplaces: Princeton University; Johns Hopkins University
- Doctoral advisor: Lanny Schmidt; Rutherford Aris

External videos
- “Yannis Kevrekidis: Data, manifold learning, and the modeling of complex/multi-scale systems”

Ioannis George (Yannís) Kevrekidis is currently the Bloomberg Distinguished Professor in Chemical and Biomolecular Engineering within the Whiting School of Engineering, Johns Hopkins University. He holds secondary appointments in the Whiting School's Department of Applied Mathematics & Statistics and the Johns Hopkins University School of Medicine's Department of Urology.

== Early life and education ==
Yannis was born in Athens, Greece. He earned a diploma in chemical engineering from the National Technical University of Athens in 1981. He subsequently earned a master's degree in mathematics from the University of Minnesota in 1986. At the same time, he worked towards a doctorate in chemical engineering from the University of Minnesota in 1987, under the supervision of Lanny D. Schmidt. His thesis was titled, "On the Dynamics of Chemical Reactions and Reactors". He published eight journal articles with his advisors including:

- I. Kevrekidis, R. Aris, L.D. Schmidt "Rate Multiplicity and Oscillations in Single Species Surface Reactions", Surface Science 102, 459, (1983).
- I. Kevrekidis, R. Aris, L.D. Schmidt "On the Dynamics of Peridically Forced Chemical Reactors", Chem. Eng. Comm. 30, 323, (1984).
- I. Kevrekidis, R. Aris, L.D. Schmidt "Forcing on Entire Bifurcation Diagram: Case Studies in Chemical Oscillators", Physica D, 23, 391, (1986).

Kevrekidis completed a post-doctoral fellowship at Los Alamos National Laboratory (1985-1986) in the Center for Nonlinear Studies and Theoretical Division.

== Career and research ==
Kevrekidis joined Princeton University in 1986 as an assistant professor of engineering. He was promoted to associate professor in 1991 and full professor in 1994. In 2007, he became the Pomeroy and Betty Perry Smith Professor of Engineering, a position which he held until 2017. At the same time, he was an associated faculty member in the Princeton Department of Mathematics and senior faculty member in the program in Applied and Computational Mathematics. In 2017, he became the Bloomberg Distinguished Professor at Johns Hopkins University in the Departments of Chemical and Biomolecular Engineering, Applied Mathematics and Statistics, and Urology.

His research interests include scientific computation for complex/multiscale systems modeling; process dynamics, computer modeling, and applied mathematics; spatiotemporal pattern formation; and nonlinear system identification and control. His research has also focused on the dynamic behavior of physical, chemical, and biological processes; the types of instabilities they exhibit; the patterns they form; and their computational study. A central contribution of Kevrekidis's research has been the development of equation-free modeling, a framework for multiscale modeling of systems in which accurate models are available at a microscopic or fine scale but the corresponding macroscopic evolution equations are unknown or unavailable in closed form. Instead of explicitly deriving those coarse-scale equations, the method uses appropriately initialized short bursts of fine-scale simulation, such as Kinetic Monte Carlo or molecular dynamics, to carry out macroscopic computational tasks including time integration, bifurcation analysis, optimization and control. Princeton University described the approach as bridging scientific computation and applied mathematics with microscopic and atomistic simulation, allowing systems-level analysis without first constructing an explicit macroscopic model.

== Honors and awards ==
In 2003 he was awarded the J.D. Crawford Prize of the Society for Industrial and Applied Mathematics for outstanding research in nonlinear science.

In 2010, the American Institute of Chemical Engineers awarded him the Richard H. Wilhelm Award in Chemical Reaction Engineering.

In 2017, Kevrekidis was elected to the American Academy of Arts and Sciences, class I (Mathematical and Physical Sciences), Section 5 (Engineering Sciences and Technologies). His election citation states:

He transformed simulation and analysis of complex, nonlinear transport and reaction processes across multiple time and space scales.

— Election Citation, American Academy of Arts and Sciences

Until June 30, 2017, he was the Pomeroy and Betty Perry Smith Professor of Engineering and professor of chemical and biological engineering with the school of engineering and applied science at Princeton University.

In 2020, Kevrekidis was elected to the National Academy of Engineering.

Other honors include but are not limited to:

- David and Lucile Packard Foundation Fellowship (1988)
- NSF Presidential Young Investigator Award (1989)
- AIChE Colburn Award, 1994
- J.S. Guggenheim Fellow, 2005
- AIChE Wilhelm Award 2010
- AIChE Fellow, 2016

Kevrekidis has also participated in numerous fellowships including the Distinguished Visiting Fellowship of the Einstein Foundation and Zuse Institute (2016–2018), the Hans Fischer Senior Fellowship of the Institute for Advanced Study in Munich (2015-2018), and the Microsoft Fellowship of the Isaac Newton Institute (2013).

== Selected works ==
Kevrekidis has more than 43,000 citations in Google Scholar and an h-index of 91.

Google Scholar citations

- Ioannis G Kevrekidis, Basil Nicolaenko, James C Scovel "Back in the saddle again: a computer assisted study of the Kuramoto–Sivashinsky equation", SIAM Journal on Applied Mathematics, 50(3), 760-790 (1990).
- Michael D Graham, Ioannis G Kevrekidis "Alternative Approaches to the Karhunen-Loève Decomposition for Model Reduction and Data Analysis", Computers & Chemical Engineering 20(5), 495-506 (1996).
- Constantinos Theodoropoulos, Yue-Hong Qian, Ioannis G Kevrekidis ""Coarse" stability and bifurcation analysis using time-steppers: A reaction-diffusion example", Proceedings of the National Academy of Sciences, 97(18), 9840-9843 (2000).
- Ioannis G Kevrekidis, C William Gear, James M Hyman, Panagiotis G Kevrekidid, Olof Runborg, Constantinos Theodoropoulos "Equation-free, coarse-grained multiscale computation: Enabling microscopic simulators to perform system-level analysis", Communications in Mathematical Sciences, 1(4), 715-762 (2003).
- Boaz Nadler, Stéphane Lafon, Ronald R Coifman, Ioannis G Kevrekidis "Diffusion maps, spectral clustering and reaction coordinates of dynamical systems", Applied and Computational Harmonic Analysis, 21(1), 113-127 (2006).
