= Interdisciplinary Center for Scientific Computing =

German research institute

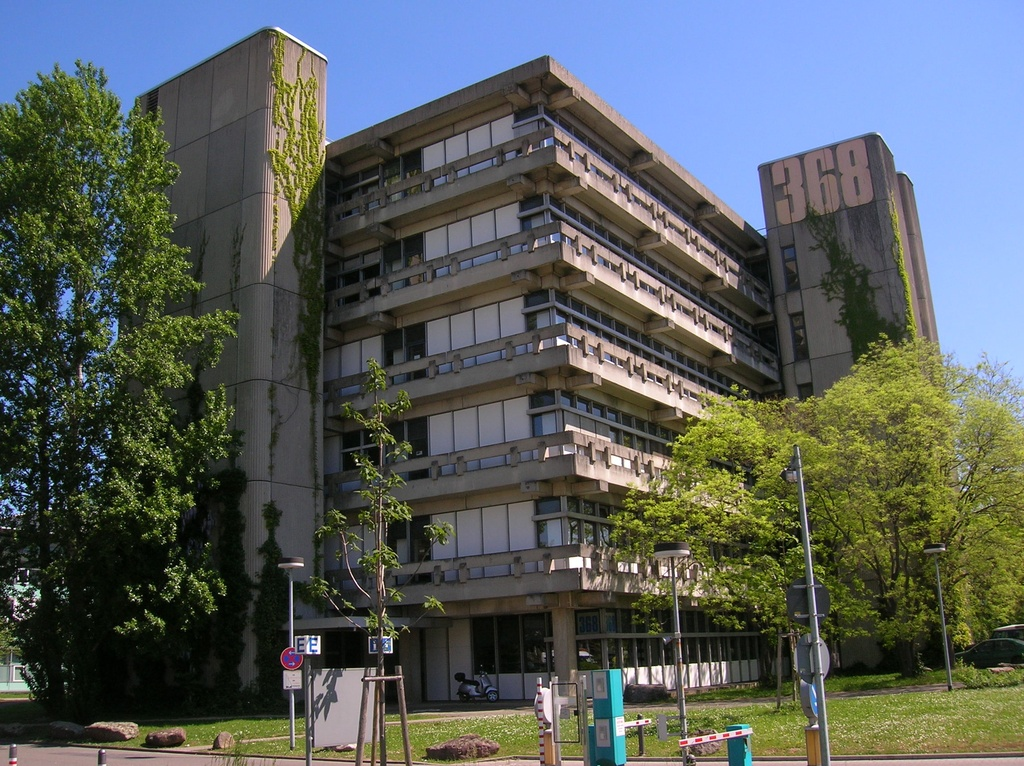
South west view of the IWR building, located at Heidelberg's New Campus (until March 2016)

The Interdisciplinary Center for Scientific Computing (short IWR) is a scientific research institute of the Heidelberg University, Germany. It centralizes scientific activity and promotes research and work in scientific computing. Founded in 1987 by the Heidelberg University and the state of Baden-Württemberg, IWR participates in joint project and cooperations with industry in Germany as well as abroad. As a research institute with about 380 staff, IWR is considered one of the world's largest research centers for scientific computing.

== Objectives ==
The main objectives of the IWR are the

- Mathematical Modeling and Computational Simulation of Complex Systems in Science and Technology,
- Development and Use of Computer Methods and Software for Applications in Industry and Economy,
- Visualization, Computer Graphics, Image Processing and the
- Education in Scientific Computing.

Within the Zukunftskonzept (institutional strategy) of the 2nd German Universities Excellence Initiative further research and application areas were exploited with a focus on Digital Humanities and Computational archaeology.

== Graduate school ==
Since November 2007 the training and education of Ph.D. students at IWR is supported by the Heidelberg Graduate School of Mathematical and Computational Methods for the Sciences (HGS MathComp). As part of the German Universities Excellence Initiative, HGS MathComp is a supported institution partially established and located at IWR, in order to realize innovative concepts for a structured education of Ph.D. students in interdisciplinary research projects.

== Software development ==
The strong focus of the IWR on applied research leads from prototype implementations to maintained software, which is available as open source or freeware like the

- Deal.II library,
- DUNE, which includes the
- UG toolbox to solve partial differential equations on unstructured meshes or the
- GigaMesh Software Framework for processing high-resolution triangular meshes

as well as proprietary software like the

- MUSCOD-II package for numerical solution of optimal control problems.

== History ==
The initial concept of the IWR was proposed in 1985 and accepted by the University Senate two years later. After securing the necessary finances, the first parallel computer was purchased in 1989. The Graduiertenkolleg "Modellierung und Wissenschaftliches Rechnen in Mathematik und Naturwissenschaften" (Modelling and Scientific Computing in Mathematics and the Sciences) was established in 1992 and evaluated by the German Research Foundation (DFG) in 1994 and 1998.

The founding director is Willi Jäger managing the IWR from 1987 until 1998. The managing director from 1999 to 2004 was professor Jürgen Warnatz. From 2005 to 2016 the board of directors consisted of professor Hans Georg Bock as managing director, professor Willi Jäger, and professor Bernd Jähne.

In the first quarter of 2016 all the IWR groups moved to the a new building called Mathematikon (Im Neuenheimer Feld 205), which can easily reached by public transportation and is located at the border of the campus at the Berliner Straße (main road). This enabled an optimal integration with the Faculty for Mathematics and Computer Science, which also moved into the Mathematikon.

Since 2017 the managing director is professor Andreas Dreuw. Michael Winckler is the administrative director of the IWR and the Heidelberg Graduate School of Mathematical and Computational Methods for the Sciences (HGS MathComp). The chairman of the HGS MathComp is professor Peter Bastian together with professor Dieter W. Hermann and professor Hans Georg Bock as deputy chairman.
