= Giovanni Paolo Galdi =

Italian-American mathematician

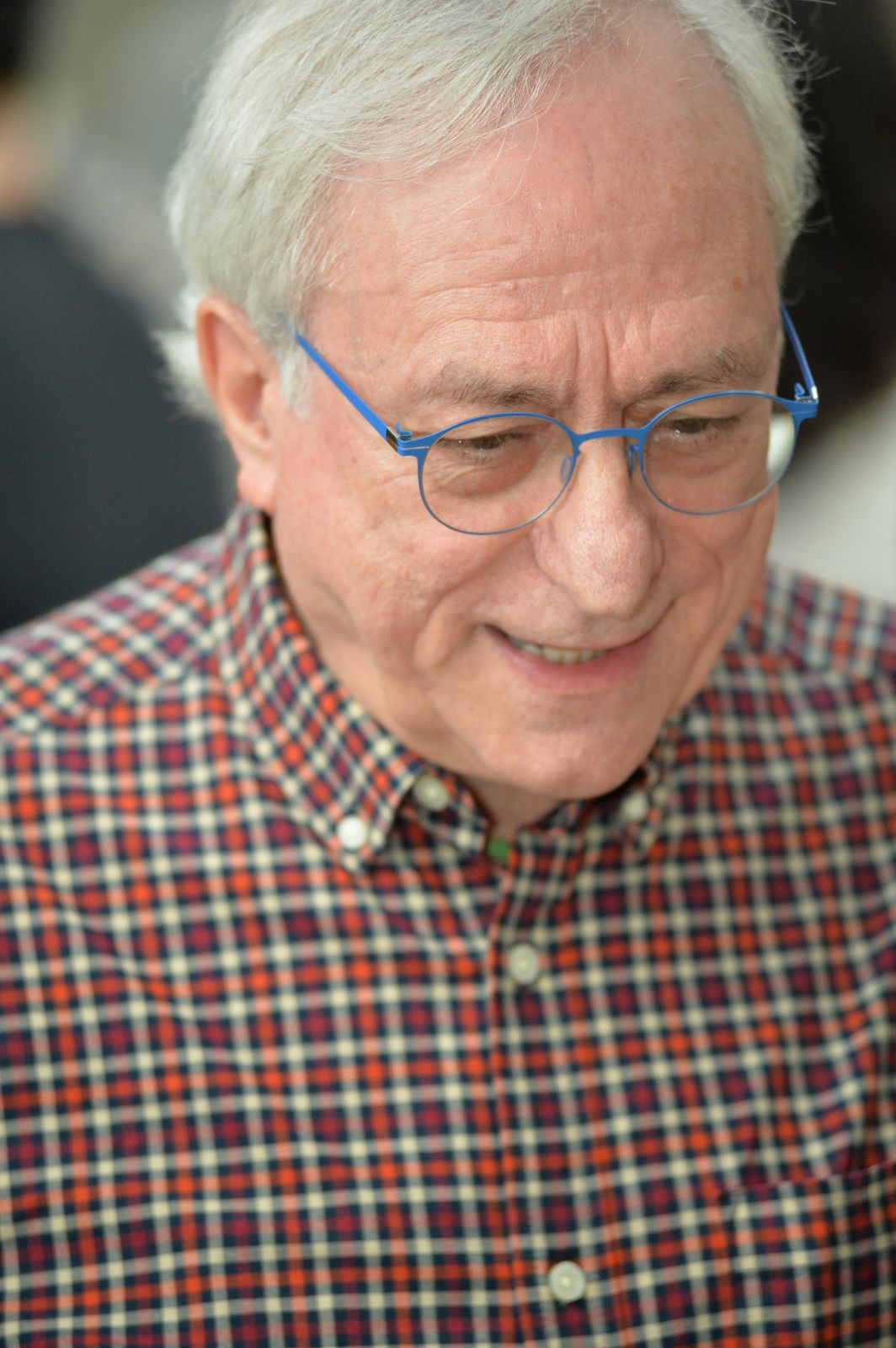
- Born: January 3, 1947 (age 79); Naples, Italy
- Education: University of Naples
- Known for: fluid dynamics, fluid-structure interaction, hydrodynamic stability, magnetohydrodynamics, Navier-Stokes Equations
- Scientific career
- Fields: Mathematics
- Academic advisors: Salvatore Rionero, James Serrin
- Website: https://www.engineering.pitt.edu/people/faculty/g.-paolo-galdi

Giovanni Paolo Galdi (born January 3, 1947) is an Italian mathematician, who works primarily on the mathematical analysis of the Navier-Stokes equations; in particular, on the topics of fluid-structure interactions and hydrodynamic stability. He is a Distinguished Professor of Mechanical Engineering and Materials Science, the Leighton E. and Mary N. Orr Professor of Engineering, and Professor of Mathematics at the University of Pittsburgh, as well as adjunct professor at the Tata Institute of Fundamental Research in Mumbai. He serves on the editorial board of the journal Nonlinear Analysis and is co-founder and editor-in-chief of the Journal of Mathematical Fluid Mechanics as well as the book series Advances in Mathematical Fluid Mechanics and Lecture Notes in Mathematical Fluid Mechanics.

== Education and career ==
Galdi earned his doctorate in Physics from the University of Naples in 1971. He would later serve as professor there, in the Department of Mathematics, after completing his post-doctoral mathematical training in 1976, under the mentorship of Salvatore Rionero and James Serrin. In 1985, he joined the University of Ferrara, where he founded the School of Engineering, serving as engineering Dean from 1989 to 1995. Since 1999, he has been a professor at the University of Pittsburgh, first in the Department of Mathematics, and then later in the Swanson School of Engineering, where he currently holds his tenure.

== Mathematical contributions ==
Galdi works in mathematical hydrodynamics, having written on the Navier-Stokes Equations and magnetohydrodynamics. Among his purely mathematical contributions is a generalized theory of homogeneous Sobolev spaces for unbounded domains, which has become a cornerstone in the study of external flows. He has also done foundational work in the mathematical theory of fluid-structure interactions, a field of research in which he is still currently active. His book, An Introduction to the Mathematical Theory of the Navier-Stokes Equations: Steady-State Problems (1994) and article On the Motion of a Rigid Body in a Viscous Liquid: A Mathematical Analysis with Applications (2002) are widely used.

In 2010, a dedicated Springer volume was published in honor of his 60th birthday.
