= Església de Sant Romà de les Bons =

Church in Les Bons, Andorra

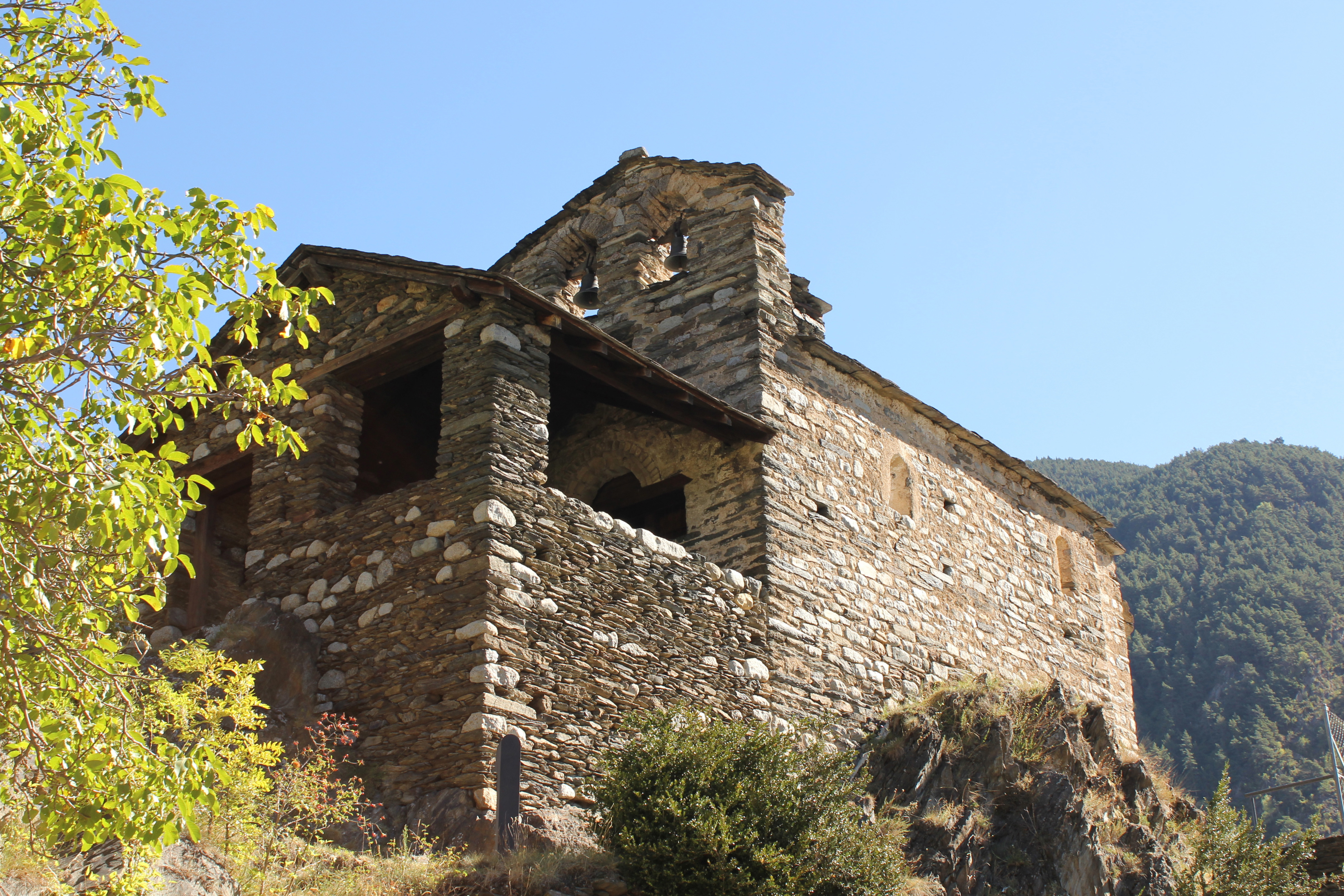
- Front façade of Església de Sant Romà de les Bons
- Església de Sant Romà de les Bons
- 42°32′20″N 1°35′13″E
- Location: Les Bons, Andorra
- Country: Andorra
- Denomination: Catholic Church
- Sui iuris church: Latin Church

History
- Consecrated: 1164

Architecture
- Architectural type: Romanesque
- Style: Lombard

Església de Sant Romà de les Bons is a church located in Les Bons, Encamp, Andorra. Consecrated in 1164, the church uses Romanesque and Lombard architecture. A Gothic repainting occurred in the 16th century, and the murals in the church are replicas of the originals that now reside in the Museu Nacional d'Art de Catalunya.

== History ==
The first documented mention of the church was in a concordat in 1162. The church was dedicated to Romanus of Caesarea. The consecration occurred on 23 January 1164. On 16 July 2003, it became a heritage property registered in the Cultural Heritage of Andorra.

== Structure ==
The rectangular church uses Romanesque and Lombard architecture. The church was repainted in the 16th century using Gothic styling.

Liturgical east and west is used by the church, but the entrance is on the west wall, as the terrain prevents the south wall being used for the entrance. The door and windows have been altered since the construction of the church and now use 16–17th century architectural styles. There is a gable bell tower. Llicorella slabs were used for the roof of the nave and apse. A porch was added sometime in the 16–17th century.

== Artwork ==
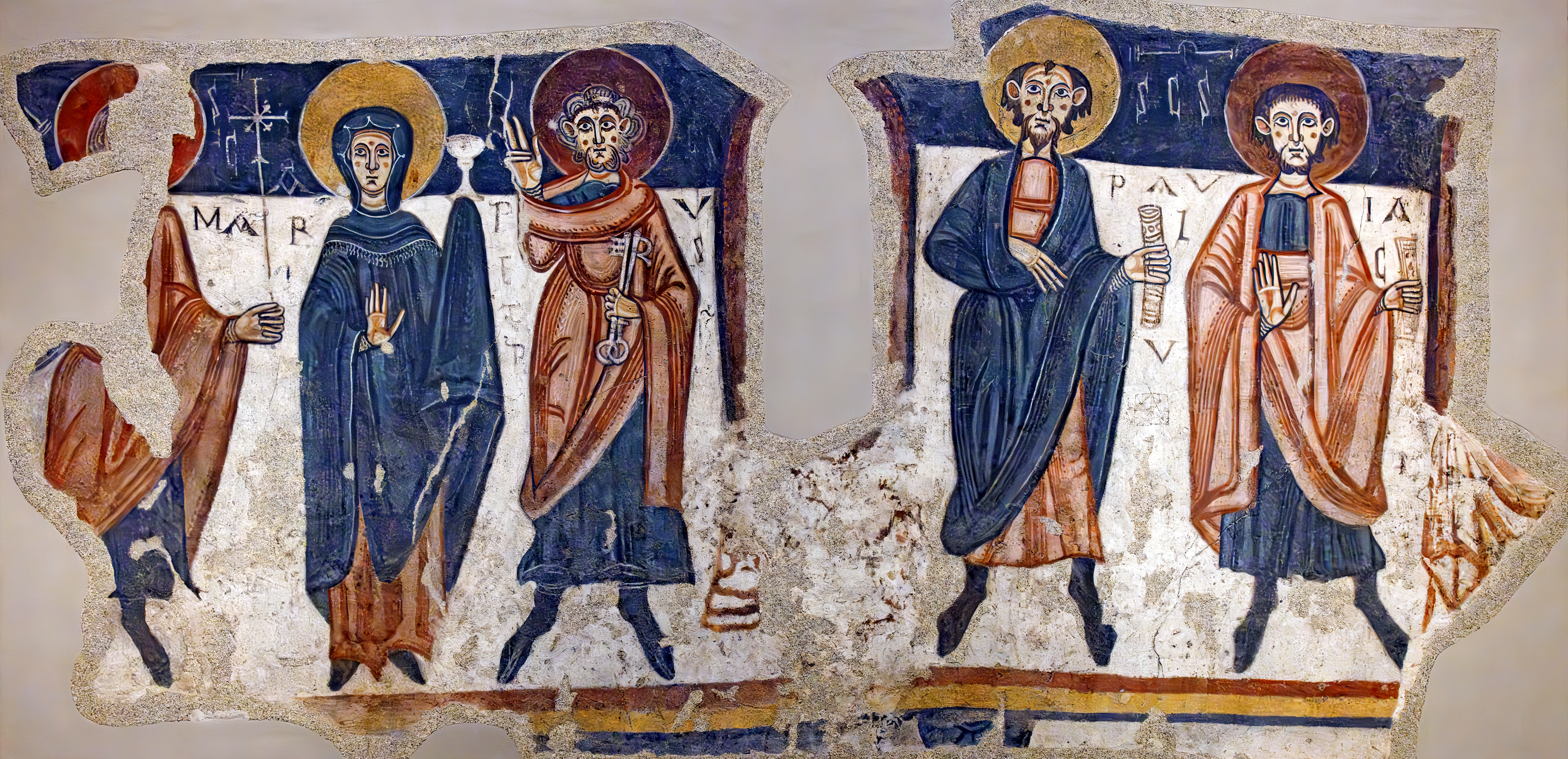
Apòstols de Sant Romà de les Bons Original frescoes MNAC

One of the murals from the church is now on display at the Museu Nacional d'Art de Catalunya as two fragments. The first fragment is 103 cm x 272 cm in size, and the second fragment is 166 cm x 342 cm in size. This mural was acquired by the museum between 1919 and 1923. A reproduction of the mural exists in place of the original in the church.

== Restoration and preservation ==
In 1986, the Andorran National Artistic Heritage Restoration Service, the Paul Getty Foundation, and the Courtauld Institute of Art started work on recreating the church's original decorations. Several restorations occurred between the 1970s and 2002.

== Works cited ==
- "Church of Sant Romà de les Bons". Cultural Heritage of Andorra. Archived from the original on 9 May 2012.
- "Sant Romà de les Bons (Encamp)". Gran Enciclopèdia Catalana. Archived from the original on 28 April 2025.
- Luengo, A. (9 June 2022). "Tres inèdits i molts tresors". Bondia. Archived from the original on 27 April 2025.
