= Taxation in Andorra =

The tax system of Andorra has evolved according to the country's economic activity and structure, and the tax bases have been expanded to optimally distribute the weight of the tax burden, going from an almost exclusively indirect tax system to a system with direct taxation that can be approved at the international level. Despite its taxes, Andorra ceased to be a tax haven for its neighboring countries years ago, and for the European Union and OECD recently.

In accordance with the mandate established in the 1993 Constitution, tax powers are divided between the Comuns — town councils – and the Government.

== History ==
After the Andorran Constitution came into force, the qualified law delimiting the powers of the Comuns, of November 4, 1993, configures and delimits the powers of the commons within the framework of their self-government.

During the period 1994–1996, an important activity of tax development was observed with the creation of five new taxes:

- Vehicle ownership rate (1994).
- Trademark Office Fees (1995).
- Tax on the registration of holders of economic activities (1995).
- Court fees (1995).
- Tax on the game of bingo (1996).

In 2000, the legislature approved the Law on the Tax on the provision of services (ISI), in accordance with the political model of generalizing indirect taxation to all sectors of the economy. It is a framework law that establishes the bases for indirect taxation on services and that, through specific laws, within two years, must be developed in all sectors.

In May 2002, the indirect tax on the provision of banking and financial services (currently repealed), and the indirect tax on the provision of Insurance services were approved. The same year, the rate was approved by reason of the notarized public faith service (currently repealed) and the tax on real estate property transfers within the framework of fiscal co-responsibility between the commons and the Government.

In 2003, Law 10/2003, of June 27, on communal finances unifies the essential elements of communal taxes and homogenizes the bases of the various tax figures that these local administrations develop through the respective ordinances. On November 3 of the same year, the three specific tax laws were passed that generalize indirect taxation to all sectors of the economy:

- Indirect tax on the provision of business and professional services.
- Indirect tax on internal production.
- Indirect tax on commercial activities.

These three new taxes, which entered into force on January 1, 2006, were replaced by the indirect general tax (IGI), which entered into force on January 1, 2013.

Government direct taxation begins in 2006 with the entry into force of the capital gains tax on property transfers. It is a direct tax that is taxed on the increase in the value of real estate that is evidenced by the inter vivos, onerous or lucrative transfers of real estate, as well as by the constitutions or transfers of real rights over them.

On December 29, 2010, three major taxes were approved in the field of direct taxation. They are:

- Law 94/2014, of December 29, on the income tax of non-tax residents
- Law 95/2010, of December 29, on Corporation Tax
- Law 96/2010, of December 29, on Income Tax from economic activities (in force until December 31, 2014)

In 2013, Andorra announced plans to impose an income tax in response to pressure from the European Union. The tax was introduced in 2015, at a flat rate of 10%. Also the General Indirect Tax (IGI) was applied. Its introduction allowed replacing the vast majority of existing indirect tax figures that taxed the consumption produced in the territory. In this way, the indirect taxation framework becomes more neutral and efficient for companies and fairer for citizens.

In 2014, the Department of Taxes and Borders was created, with the aim of establishing an administrative authority in charge of managing the tax system and the customs system, equipped with human resources and legal mechanisms that allow for management and collection effective income of a tax nature.

Finally, on January 1, 2014, the Personal Income Tax (IRPF) came into force, which completes the configuration of the Andorran fiscal framework and introduces a tax system comparable to that existing in other neighboring countries, the European Union and the OECD. The new tax covers all the income that the taxpayer may obtain, regardless of its type and source, also incorporating business income that until then was taxed on income tax from economic activities.

- Law 5/2014, of April 24, on the Income Tax of natural persons
- Law 42/2014, of December 11, amending Law 5/2014, of April 24, on Personal Income Tax

=== Banking secrecy and Tax Haven status ===
In 2016, Andorra took steps to renounce banking secrecy to end its status as a tax haven.

== Communal tax system ==
The qualified Law delimiting the powers of the commons determines the taxing power of municipalities in relation to taxes:

- The traditional tax of "foc i lloc" (fire and place).
- The property tax.
- The tax on rental income.
- The filing or location tax of commercial, business and professional activities.
- The construction tax.

== State tax system ==
The fees, taxes and rates that compound the state tax system of Andorra are:

=== Fees ===
- Tax on the Registry of Holders of Economic Activities: Law on the rate on the Registry of Holders of Economic Activities, of 12-20-95 and Law 26/2013, of December 19, amending Law 6/2008, of May 15, the exercise of liberal professions and professional colleges and associations.
- Vehicle Ownership Tax Rate: Vehicle Ownership Tax Law, dated 4-4-94, Law to Modify the Vehicle Ownership Tax Law, dated 04-11-96, Law 24 / 2014, of October 30, of personalized vehicle registration plates.
- Immigration Fees: Qualified Immigration Law of May 14, 2002.
- Court fees: Law on court fees, dated 12-20-95, Law on court fees, dated June 22, 2000.
- Trademark Office Fees Public Prices: Trademark Office Fees Act of 5-10-95.
- Rate of job applications: Law 16/2013, of October 10, amending Law 9/2012, of May 31, amending the Qualified Immigration Law.
- Animal health and food safety rate (2012): Law 14/2012, of July 12, on animal health and food safety.

=== Direct taxation ===
- Capital gains tax on property transfers (PLV) (2006). Legislative Decree of April 29, 2015, for the publication of the consolidated text of Law 21/2006, of December 14, on the Capital Gains Tax on property transfers.
- Tax on non-residents income tax (IRNR) (2010). Legislative Decree of April 29, 2015, for the publication of the consolidated text of Law 94/2010, of December 29, on the Income Tax of non-tax residents.
- Corporation Tax (IS) (2010). Legislative Decree of April 29, 2015, for the publication of the consolidated text of Law 95/2010, of December 29, on Corporation Tax.
- Personal income tax (personal income tax). (IAE until December 31, 2014). Legislative Decree of April 29, 2015, for the publication of the consolidated text of Law 5/2014, of April 24, on the Income Tax of natural persons.
- Income tax (IRPF) . Law 11/2005, of June 13, applying the Agreement between the Principality of Andorra and the European Community regarding the establishment of measures equivalent to those provided for in Council Directive 2003/48 / EC on taxation of income from savings in the form of interest payments.
- Gambling activities tax. Law 37/2014, of December 11, regulating gambling

=== Indirect taxation ===
- Property transfer tax (ITP) (2000). Real Estate Transfer Tax Law, of December 29, 2000. Law 6/2004, of April 14, on the punctual modification of the Real Estate Transfer Tax Law. Law 7/2006, of June 21, amending the Real Estate Transfer Tax Law.
- Tax on the provision of insurance services (2002). Indirect Tax Law on the provision of insurance services, dated May 14, 2002.
- Special Taxes (2008). Law 27/2008, of November 20, on Special Taxes (BOPA No. 94, year 20) modified by Law 11/2010, of April 22, amending Law 27/2008, of November 20, on special taxes (BOPA No. 29, year 22) – consolidated version. Law 27/2008 on Special Taxes, of November 20, 2008 (BOPA 94, year 20).
- Indirect General Tax (IGI) (2012). Legislative Decree of March 16, 2016, for the publication of the consolidated text of Law 11/2012, of June 21, on the General Indirect Tax.

=== Customs duties and fees ===
==== Consumption rates ====
- Decree modifying the Decree by which the General Nomenclature of Products is communicated
- Law 10/2010, of April 22, modifiació of the tariff of rates to the consumption.
- Consumption Tax Law of December 30, 1985 (repealed except articles 1,2 and 20)
- Law of modification of the law of taxes on consumption, dated December 30, 1985, and the law of indirect merchandise tax, dated June 26, 1991, of 11-27-93 (Bopa 70, year 05 )
- Law of modification of the general tariff of consumption rates, of 30-6-95 (Bopa 42, year 07)
- Law of modification of the Law of rates on consumption dated December 30, 1985, of 5-10-95 (Bopa 64, year 07)
- Law of modification of the general tariff of consumption rates, of 11-7-96 (Bopa 57, year 08)
- Law of modification of the general tariff of consumption rates, of 13-11-97 (Bopa 74, year 09)
- Law of modification of the general tariff of rates to the consumption, of 11-3-98 (Bopa 16, year 10)
- Law of modification of the general tariff of consumption rates, of 4-6-98 (Bopa 33, year 10)
- Law of modification of the general tariff of rates to the consumption, of 10-12-98 (Bopa 01, year 11)
- Law of modification of the general tariff of consumption rates, of June 22, 2000 (Bopa 41, year 12)
- Law of modification of the general tariff of consumption rates, of July 4, 2001 (Bopa 71, year 13)
- Law 2/2003, of January 24, amending the general rate of consumption rates (Bopa 15, year 14)
- Law 10/2010, of April 22, on the modification of the general tariff of consumer rates (Bopa 29, year 22)
- Law 11/2010, of April 22, amending Law 27/2008, of November 20, on Special Taxes (BOPA 29, year 22)
- Law 3/2011, of February 15, of modification of the general rate of rates on consumption. Llei 3/2011, of February 15, of modification of the general rate of rates on consumption (Bopa 16, year 23)
- Law 1/2012, of March 1, on the modification of the general rate of rates on consumption (Bopa 14, year 24)
- Law 12/2012, of July 3, on the modification of the general rate of rates on consumption (Bopa 37, year 24)

== Income tax ==
Andorra introduced the personal income tax regime on the first of January 2015. It is a tax composed of sections that are applied on the income tax base, similar to that of neighboring countries. Without going into the many details of the tax and in a simplified way:

- From 0 to 24,000 € of income is taxed at 0%
- From €24,000 to €40,000 of income the rate is 5%
- Any amount over €40,000 of income is required to pay 10%

The tax on savings income follow the same regime as the income tax, but the difference in this case is that the first €3,000 of investment income is tax exempt. The rest of income is taxed at 10%.

== Corporate tax ==
The more relevant tax on corporations in Andorra is the IS or Impost de Societats (IS), and corresponds to a fixed general rate of 10%.

There are in addition some bonuses for new corporations:

- In the first year, any taxpayer has a 50% reduction in the settlement fee.
- For the taxpayers of this tax who are constituted as new entrepreneurs of a new business or professional activity and who have an income of less than 100,000 euros, the applicable tax rate during the first 3 years of activity is:
  - 5% for the part of the tax base between 0 and 50,000 euros.
  - 10% on the basis of remaining taxation.

== Value added tax ==
Andorra is not part of the EU VAT area, despite being in a customs union with the EU. On January 1, 2013, Andorra introduced the IGI (Impost General Indirecte), that is the main value added tax and indirect tax, replacing the sales tax regime. Its general tax rate is 4.5%, but there are some other rates applied to certain goods and services:

- Super reduced rate (0%) for health and CASS services, education, gold investment and certain NGOs services
- Reduced rate (1%) for human consumption goods, books, magazines
- Special rate (2.5%) for transportation and artistic and culture services
- Increased rate (9.5%) for banking and financial services.

== Capital gains tax on property transfers (PLV) ==
When someone want to sell Andorran property to obtain some profit, a capital gains tax will be applied on the real asset. The nominal rate is 15% if the property is sold before the first year, 13% if it is sold in the second year of possession, 10% in the third year of possession and decreases by 1% each year after the third year (so the rate can be 0% in the 12th year). However, an individual can avoid the capital gains tax buying another property before six months of the sale.
