= Les Bons =

Village in Encamp, Andorra

- Village
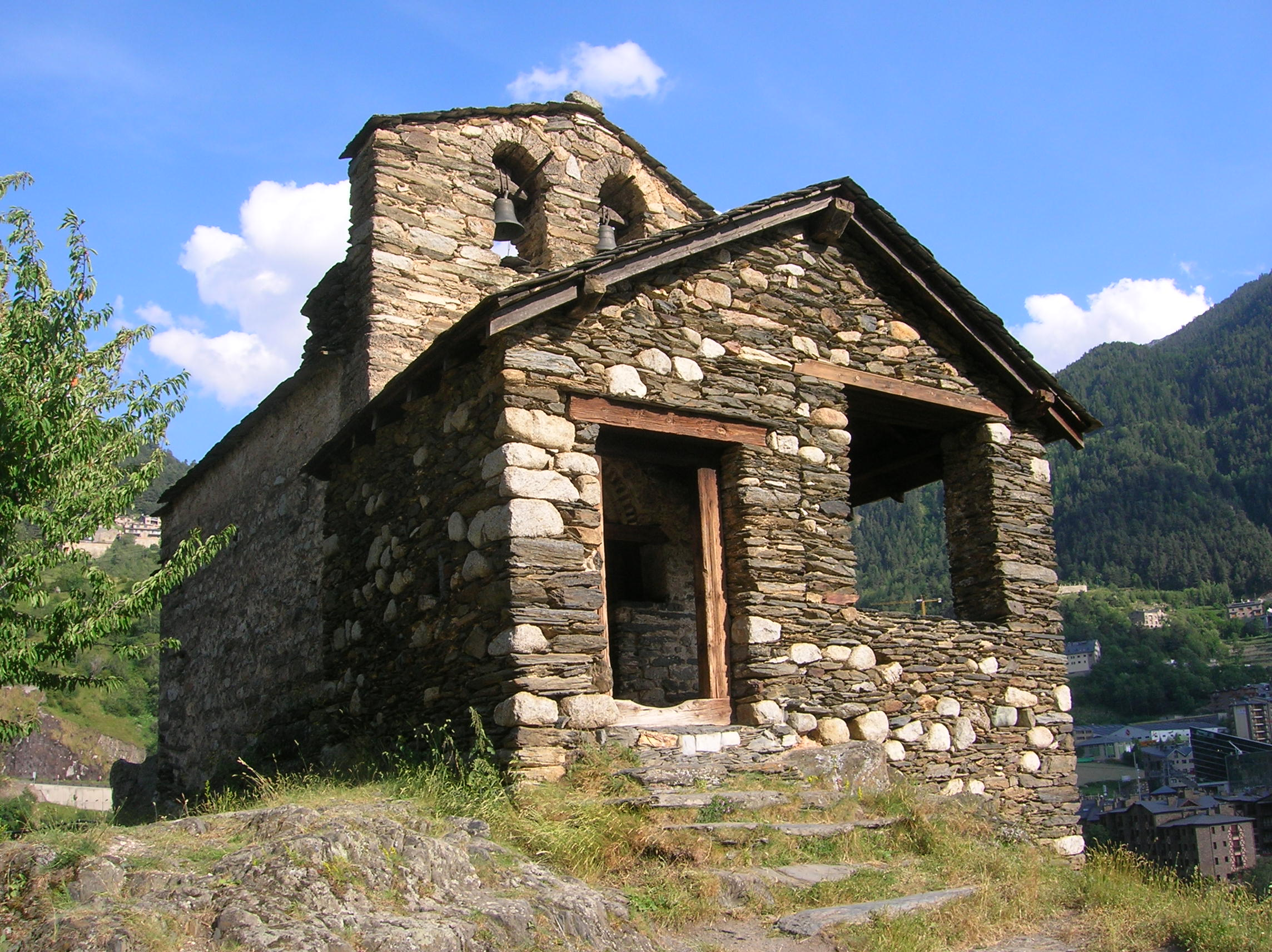
- The 12th-century Romanesque church of Sant Romà de les Bons

- Location in Andorra
- Coordinates: 42°32′00″N 1°35′00″E
- Country: Andorra
- Parish: Encamp
- Elevation: 1,617 m (5,305 ft)

Population (2024)
  - Total: 1,171
- Time zone: UTC+01:00 (CET)
  - Summer (DST): UTC+02:00 (CEST)

Les Bons (Catalan pronunciation: [lez ˈβɔns]) is a village in the parish of Encamp, Andorra. The Romanesque church Església de Sant Romà de les Bons is located within the village. The village is undergoing a renovation project that is expected to end in 2026.

== Geography ==
Les Bons is located within the parish of Encamp, in the country of Andorra. It is at an altitude of 1,336 meters. The area is at risk for landslides and was unreachable by vehicles for a week in 2021, as demolition work was done on the Hort del Roc terrace to prevent future landslides. €500,000 were spent in 2023, in order to fix a slope that had rocks falling onto the roads.

== History ==
The 12th century Romanesque church Església de Sant Romà de les Bons is located within Les Bons. Església de Sant Romà de les Bons and Torre dels Moros have both been submitted to become UNESCO World Heritage Sites. In 1551, Pont lo Vell, a man from Les Bons, was accused of witchcraft.

An 18 month renovation project for the town started in 2024, and is expected to end in 2026. The €2.4 million project would replace all of the pavement in the village, rebuild the supply and water networks, bury telecommunications and electricity lines, and renovate historic locations within the village.

== Demographics ==
The population of Les Bons rose from 992 in 2010, to 1,171 in 2024. The English poet James Kirkup was a resident of the village.

== Transportation ==
The area has been serviced since 2021 by an on-demand bus service operated by Uclic.

== Works cited ==
=== News ===
- "El Comú d'Encamp preveu renovar el bus a la demanda per un període de fins a 4 anys". Bondia. 26 October 2022. Archived from the original on 27 April 2025.
- "El Comú destinarà 500.000 euros a arranjar un talús a les Bons". Bondia. 21 June 2023. Archived from the original on 27 April 2025.
- "La torre dels Moros cau de la candidatura a la Unesco". Bondia. 21 January 2021. Archived from the original on 27 April 2025.
- "L'últim blasfem d'Albió (vivia a les Bons)". Bondia. 9 December 2019. Archived from the original on 27 April 2025.
- "Robert Pastor, historiador: "Les quinze dones executades per bruixeria les va condemnar Corts"". Bondia. 20 April 2023. Archived from the original on 27 April 2025.
- Perez, Gabriel (21 April 2025). "La reforma del nucli antic de les Bons compleix, per ara, el calendari". Altaveu. Archived from the original on 27 April 2025.
- Solanelles, Toni (17 August 2021). "Unes obres de sanejament 'aïllen' el poblet de les Bons durant una setmana". Altaveu. Archived from the original on 27 April 2025.

=== Web ===
- "les Bons". Gran Enciclopèdia Catalana. Archived from the original on 27 April 2025.
- "Statistic and Data". Andorra.
