= Escaldes Hydroelectric Power Station =

Escaldes Hydroelectric Power Plant
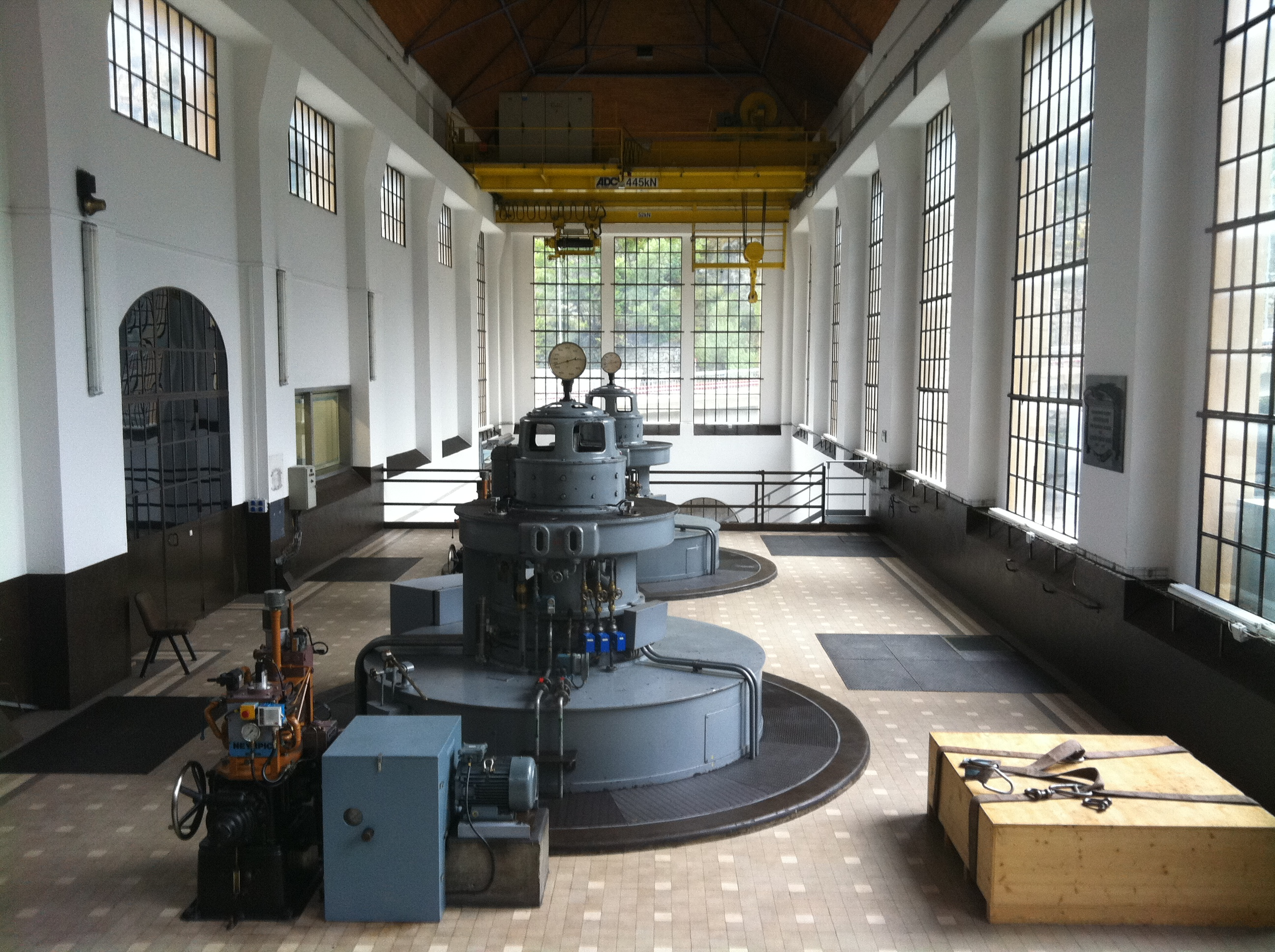
- Inside the power house
- Interactive map of Escaldes Hydroelectric Power Plant
- Country: Andorra
- Location: Engolasters, Encamp
- Coordinates: 42°30′54.11″N 1°33′12.94″E
- Status: Operational
- Construction began: 1930
- Opening date: 1934
- Operator: Forces Elèctriques d'Andorra

Power Station
- Hydraulic head: 490 m
- Turbines: 2 x 14 MW, 1 x 17 MW Pelton-type
- Installed capacity: 45 MW

Escaldes Hydroelectric Power Station is located in Engolasters of the Encamp parish in Andorra. Its namesake, Les Escaldes, is located just to the south in Escaldes-Engordany parish. It uses water from Lake Engolasters, located 1,616 metres (5,302 ft) above sea level in order to generate hydroelectricity. A 1,250 metres (4,100 ft) long penstock deliver water from the 178 m (584 ft) long Engolasters Dam to the power station which contains two 14 MW and one 17 MW Pelton turbine-generators. The difference in elevation between the lake and power station is about 490 metres (1,610 ft).

In 1929 the General Council of Andorra granted Forces Andorranes Societat Anonima (FASA), a Spanish and French-owned company, the ability to develop the country for hydroelectric power. In return, FASA would construct roads various highways connecting to Andorra in return for exporting the energy. Construction of the power station and Engolasters Dam began in 1930 and the power station with two 14 MW generators was commissioned in August 1934. Beginning in 2007, a third Pelton turbine-generator was added to the station. At 17 MW, it was commissioned in 2008.

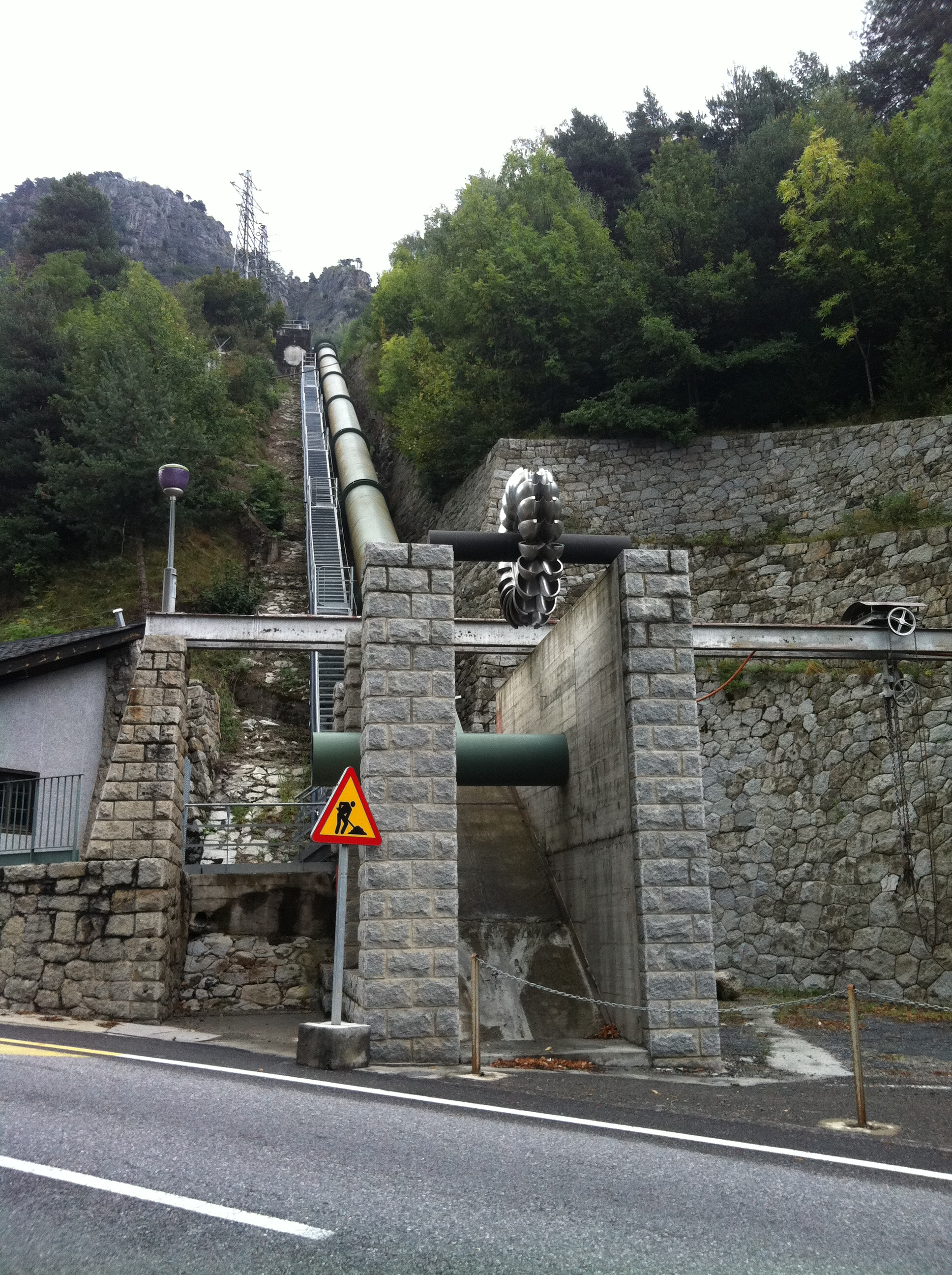
Penstock extending from Engolasters Dam
