= National Automobile Museum (Andorra) =

Automobile museum in Encamp, Andorra

- Museu Nacional de l'Automòbil
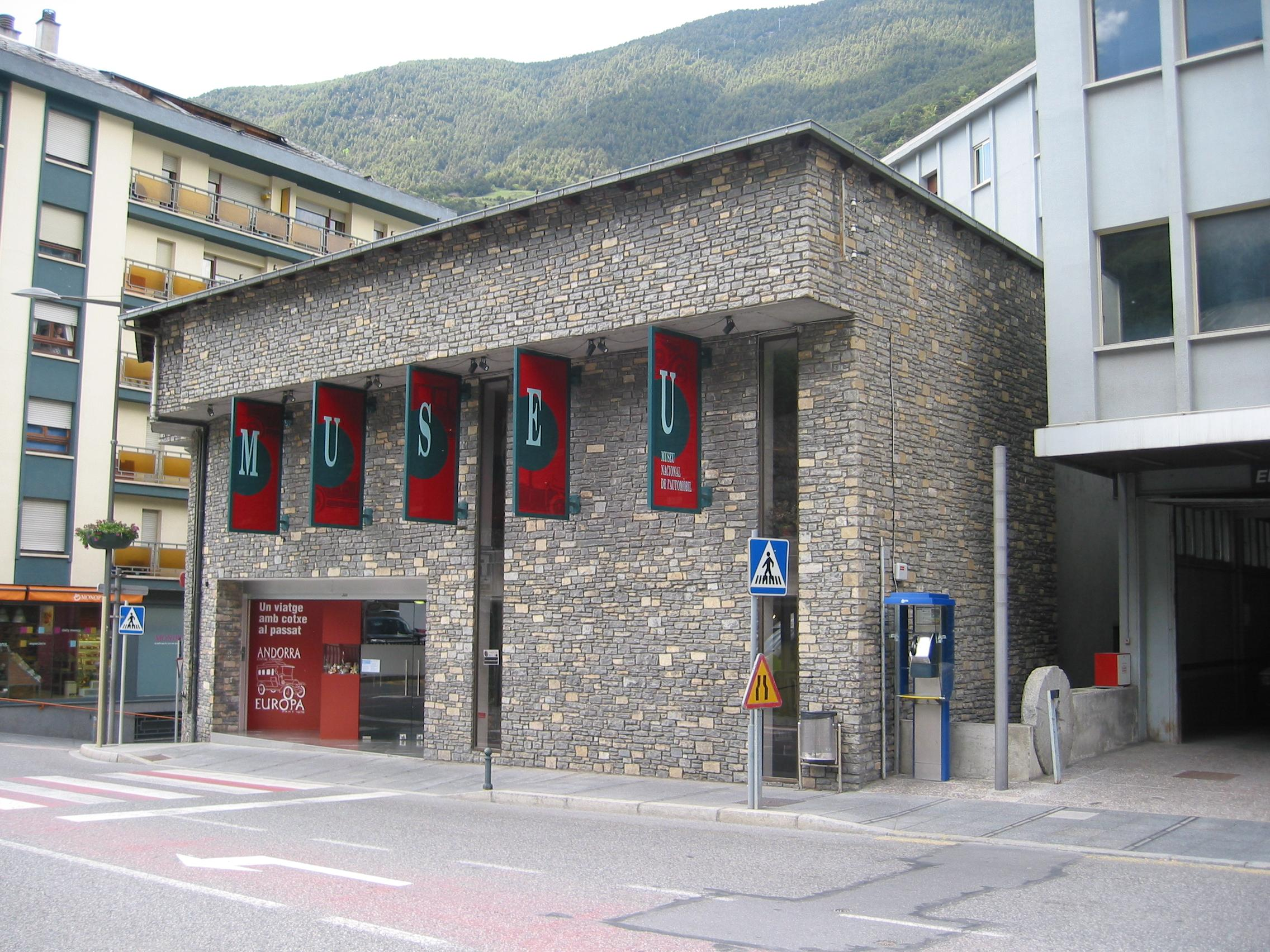

- Location within Andorra
- Established: 1987
- Location: Encamp, Andorra
- Coordinates: 42°31′59.2″N 1°34′40.4″E
- Type: automobile museum

The National Automobile Museum (Catalan: Museu Nacional de l'Automòbil) is an automobile museum in Encamp, Andorra.

== History ==
The museum was inaugurated in 1987.

== Exhibitions ==
The museum has a collection of 80 cars, 60 motorbikes and around 100 bicycles. It also features posters, advertisements, accessories, and other assorted automotive memorabilia.

== See also ==
- List of museums in Andorra
