= Radio Océan/Atlantic 2000 =

San Sebastián; Spain
- Broadcast area: France

Programming
- Language: French

History
- First air date: 1956 (first stage); 1968 (second stage)
- Last air date: 1960 (first stage); 1975 (second stage)

Radio Océan, later renamed Atlantic 2000, was a peripheral radio station, audible on the French Atlantic coast from the Basque Country to Brest. It transmitted in medium wave of 273 m, from a transmitter located in Mount Ulia, near San Sebastián (Spain).

== History ==
=== First stage ===
In 1955, Jacques Trémoulet (owner of Radio Andorra) observed that his radio station was barely audible in the Basque Country. He decided to create a new radio station in this region reaching an agreement with a Spanish station from the SER network that has a transmitter located near San Sebastián. In April 1956, this station began broadcasting under the name of Radio Atlantic, broadcasting daily Radio Andorra programs in French from 12:00 to 1:30 p.m. and from 6:00 to 8:00 p.m.

In May 1960, Radio Atlantic can no longer finance its programs. Jacques Trémoulet, still owner of the station and of Radio Andorra, decides to close Radio Atlantic and concentrate his activity solely on his Andorran station.

=== Second stage ===
At the end of 1967, after the inauguration of Sud Radio at Pic Blanc in Andorra and the improvement of the broadcasting of this station in the south-west of France, Jacques Trémoulet, still head of Radio Andorra, had to react and decided to reopen a repeater of his radio to cover in good conditions the French Basque Country and the French Atlantic coast.

In 1968 Radio Andorra returned to the Basque Country. Jacques Trémoulet signs on this occasion an agreement with another Spanish radio station in San Sebastián, La Voz de Guipuzcoa (from the REM network) and launches on August 14, 1968, a new station called Radio Océan, audible in an area that extends from the Basque Country to Brest.

Radio Océan progressively expanded its programming and the duration of its programming. By 1970, the broadcasts were no longer recorded in Andorra, but were produced live from the San Sebastián studio or from the new studio located in Bayonne. In fact, Radio Océan becomes one of the first private local radio stations in France. In 1971, polls estimated his audience at 300,000 listeners. His program was published in the columns of French radio and television weeklies.

In 1971, after the death of Jacques Trémoulet, his successors at Radio Andorra didn't want to continue the Radio Océan experience. That is why they signed an agreement with the newspaper Sud Ouest, directed by Henri Amouroux. The radio would benefit from the infrastructure of the regional newspaper for the coverage of the events and its promotion in the columns of the Sud-Ouest.

The radio entrusted its advertising management to the newspaper Sud Ouest for 3 years, which assumed full control of it. Radio Océan in 1972 continued its development reaching 650,000 listeners in Aquitaine and on the French Atlantic coast. It broadcast 5 hours of programs in French and 30 minutes in Basque every day.

On July 4, 1972, Radio Océan changed its name to Atlantic 2000. Studios were opened in Anglet. Elements of programs recorded from Paris were even produced. At that time, it was planned to build a specific transmitter for the station so as not to depend more on the time slots of Voz de Guipuzcoa.

At the end of 1974, Henri Amouroux left the management of Sud Ouest. The new management of the newspaper didn't want to continue with this radio experience because the economic crisis of that year prevented it from obtaining good advertising revenue.

The fatal blow for Atlantic 2000 was the death of General Franco in November 1975. As a sign of mourning, all radio stations in Spain had to broadcast only classical music without advertising for several weeks. Atlantic 2000, which broadcast from San Sebastián, was obliged to comply with this obligation. The radio management took the opportunity to definitively stop the station.
