= Tourism in Andorra =

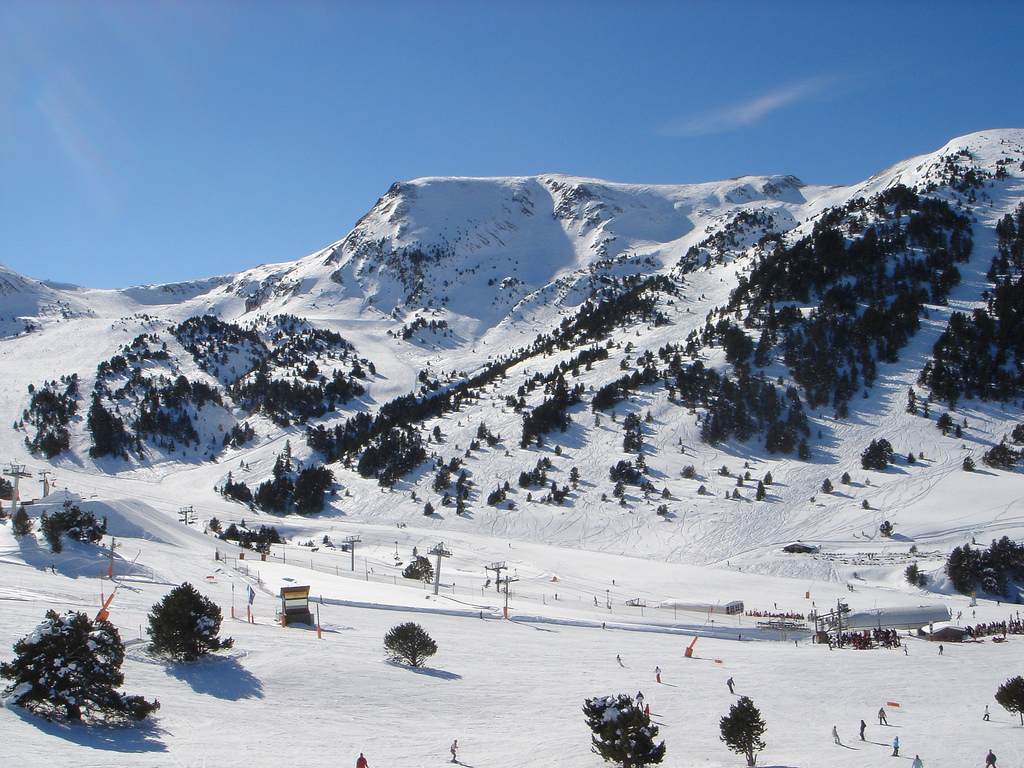
Grandvalira ski resort

Andorra is a tourist destination in Europe. Tourism in Andorra revolves around outdoor activities such as hiking and skiing, shopping, gastronomy, and cultural experiences.

Tourist arrivals of 2024 in %

Yearly tourist arrivals in millions

== Skiing ==
Andorra has several major ski resorts, including:

- Grau Roig within Grandvalira station, in Encamp
- El Pas de la Casa in Encamp
- Soldeu/El Tarter in Canillo
- Pal/Arinsal in La Massana, jointly becoming Vallnord, also reaching Ordino

These are very popular with tourists from Spain, France and the United Kingdom, particularly because their relatively gentle slopes are ideal for less experienced people as well as families. Andorran ski schools are among the largest in Europe. Andorra also has many hiking trails which can be explored during the summer months, when the snow has thawed. Cross-country running, and cycling are also popular activities.

== Shopping ==
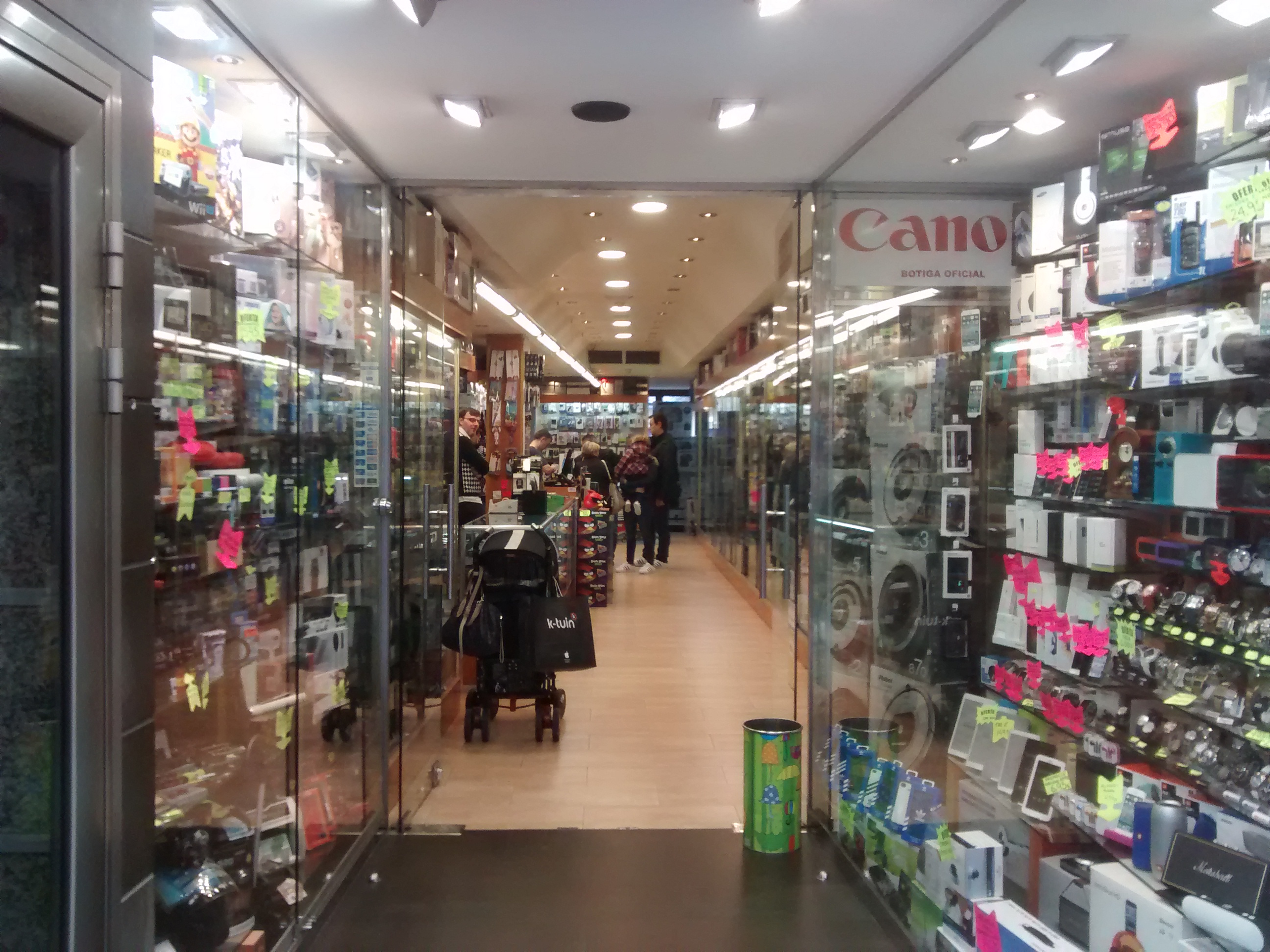
Many tourists come to Andorra for shopping.

Because it is not a member of the European Union, Andorra is able to sell a wide range of duty-free products, including alcohol, perfume and cigarettes. Shops in Andorra close for only four days per year. Shops also have long hours, with business days from Sunday to Thursday often lasting until 8 p.m., and on Friday and Saturday shops are generally open until 9 p.m.

== Organisation ==
The official tourism agency is Andorra Turisme SAU, established on 21 September 2007, with the task of improving Andorra's tourism competitiveness. The company designs marketing strategies for Andorran tourism and operates the website Visit Andorra. Their functions include creating and promoting tourist products, managing knowledge around tourism, creating and managing the tourist information network, and coordinating the tourist value chain. A 2008 source asserts 10.2 million visitors. In 2021 there were approximately 5.4 million visitors, after a decline to during the COVID-19 pandemic in 2020.The number of annual tourists had risen to 9.6 million annually by 2025. This equates to 118 tourists per each resident.
