= Angelina Mas Joaniquet =

Andorran social activist (1943–2026)

Angelina Mas Joaniquet (1943 – 9 June 2026) was an Andorran social activist, known for her central role in the push for women's suffrage in the country.

== Biography ==
Angelina Mas Joaniquet was born in Encamp, Andorra, in 1943. She was educated in France, studying business.

A businesswoman, she worked in her family hotel business, and she was also known for her philanthropy.

Beginning in the late 1960s, Mas played a key role in the campaign for universal women's suffrage in Andorra, as part of the Grup de Dones activist group. Women eventually gained the right to vote in Andorra in 1970, participating in their first elections the following year.

Mas was also an advocate for the decriminalization of abortion, which is completely illegal in Andorra, and for other women's rights. Another important issue for Mas was disability rights, which she fought for as president of the group AMIDA.

She also worked to reform Andorra's social security system, serving as board president of Andorra's social security agency, the Caixa Andorrana de Seguretat Social. Though she never directly entered political office, she was engaged in party politics with the Democratic Party, National Democratic Group, and Liberals of Andorra.

In 2025, Mas was honored for her work on women's suffrage with the Order of Charlemagne. Mas died on 9 June 2026, at the age of 82. At the time, she was the oldest surviving member of the early women's rights activists who pushed for suffrage in Andorra. On her death, the Andorran politician Sandra Codina identified her as a "key figure in the history of women’s rights" in the country.
