= Josep Carles Laínez =

Spanish writer (born 1970)

- Born: 1970 (age 55–56); Valencia, Valencia province, Valencian Community, Spain
- Occupation: Writer
- Writing career
- Movements: Asturian language literature, Aragonese language literature

Josep Carles Laínez (born 1970) is a Spanish writer who lives in Valencia, Spain and Encamp, Andorra. A graduate of the University of Valencia in Catalan and Spanish Philology and Audio-visual Communication, his main interest is in European minority languages, and he has published original books and/or articles in Catalan, English, Spanish, Occitan, Aragonese and Asturian. He is currently the editor-in-chief of the literary-philosophical quarterly journal Debats.

In his book of poetry Música junto al río (Music by the River, 2001), he uses a dialectal Valencian-Aragonese from the region of his parents. His book La piedra ente la ñeve (The Stone in the Snow, 2010) is notable as the first Latter-day Saint-related book published in Asturian and the first to use the Deseret alphabet for a language other than English. He has also published a translation of aphorisms from the Asturian into the Spanish language (Ene marginalia, 2003).

Laínez is a columnist for the Andorran newspaper El Periòdic d'Andorra, and has been a visiting professor at the National Autonomous University of Mexico, University of Puerto Rico, Hofstra University of New York and Komazawa University of Tokyo.

== Publications ==
=== In Spanish ===
Poetry

- Exotica martyria, Valencia: Ojuebuey, 1991
- Música junto al río, Valencia: Llambert Palmart, 2001. ISBN 84-931682-2-X

Fiction

- Alma, Valencia: Ediciones de la Mirada, 1998. ISBN 84-922869-4-6
- Una noche más, Valencia: Llambert Palmart, 2002. ISBN 84-932752-6-3

Non-Fiction

- La tumba de Leónidas, Barcelona: Áltera, 2006. ISBN 84-89779-91-0
- Aquí la noche tiene el nombre de Valeria, Valencia: Institució Alfons el Magnànim, 2007. ISBN 978-84-7822-497-5

=== In Catalan ===
Poetry

- Dionysiaka, Alzira: Germania, 1995
- Anxia, Alzira: Bromera, 2001

Drama

- Berlín, Valencia: Llambert Palmart, 2001. ISBN 84-931682-4-6

=== In Asturian ===
Poetry

- La piedra ente la ñeve, Uviéu: Trabe, 2010. ISBN 978-84-8053-559-5

Drama

- Elsa metálico, Uviéu: Academia Llingua Asturiana, 1998. ISBN 84-8168-149-0
- Thule, Uviéu: Academia Llingua Asturiana, 2010. ISBN 84-8168-493-7

=== In Aragonese ===
Poetry

- En o gudrón espigol xuto, Teruel: Sur Edizions, 1991.
- Aire de liloileras: (peruigilium veneris), Uesca: Consello d'a Fabla Aragonesa, 1992. ISBN 84-86036-40-2
- A besita de l'ánchel, Uesca: Consello d'a Fabla Aragonesa, 1994. ISBN 84-86036-50-X
- Bel diya, Uesca: Consello d'a Fabla Aragonesa, 1998. ISBN 84-86036-72-0

== Bibliography ==
- Ballester Añón, Rafael, “Poetas de los noventa”, in PosData, Levante-EMV (Valencia, December 1992).
- Barrero, Miguel, “Josep Carles Laínez medita nun llibru sobre l’espíritu de Castiella”, in Les Noticies, 573 (February 2008), p. 17.
- Bellveser, Ricardo, Vita Nuova. Antología de escritores valencianos en el fin de siglo, Valencia: Ajuntament de València, 1993, pp. 231, 236.
- Bolado García, Xosé, “El Surdimientu. El Teatru”, in RAMOS CORRADA, Miguel (coord.), Historia de la Lliteratura Asturiana, Oviedo: Academia de la Llingua Asturiana, 2002, pp. 706–707.
- Cepero I Salat, Carles, “Introducción a un ensayo sobre la evolución de la poesía aragonesa”, in NAGORE LAÍN, Francho, Francho Rodés & Chesús Vázquez, Estudios y rechiras arredol de a luenga aragonesa y de a suya literatura, Huesca, Instituto de Estudios Altoaragoneses, 1999, pp. 283–298.
- Eito Mateo, Antón, "Breve acercamiento a la poesía aragonesa contemporánea", in Ianua, 1 (ISSN 1616-413X).
- Llopesa, Ricardo, Poetas Valencianos del 90. Antología y diccionario, Valencia, Instituto de Estudios Modernistas: 2000, pp. 29–31, 102.
- Nagore Laín, Francho, “La llengua aragonesa: entre l’extinció i la normativització”, in Miquel-Àngel Pradilla Cardona (coord.), Calidoscopi lingüístic. Un debat entorn de les llengües de l’Estat, Barcelona, Octaedro, 2004, pp. 215–244.
- Parra Ruiz, Cristofo Ch., “Os haikus en a poesía feita en aragonés”, in NAGORE LAÍN, Francho (ed.), Terzera trobada d’estudios e rechiras arredol d’a luenga aragonesa e a suya literatura, Huesca, Instituto de Estudios Altoaragoneses-Consello d’a Fabla Aragonesa, 2004, pp. 279–296.
- RodrÍguez Magda, Rosa María, “La poesía en aragonés de Josep Carles Laínez: Generación X, American way of life y posmodernidad”, in Nagore Laín, Francho (ed.), Terzera trobada d’estudios e rechiras arredol d’a luenga aragonesa e a suya literatura, Huesca, Instituto de Estudios Altoaragoneses-Consello d’a Fabla Aragonesa, 2004, pp. 379–386.
