= Vila, Andorra =

Vila
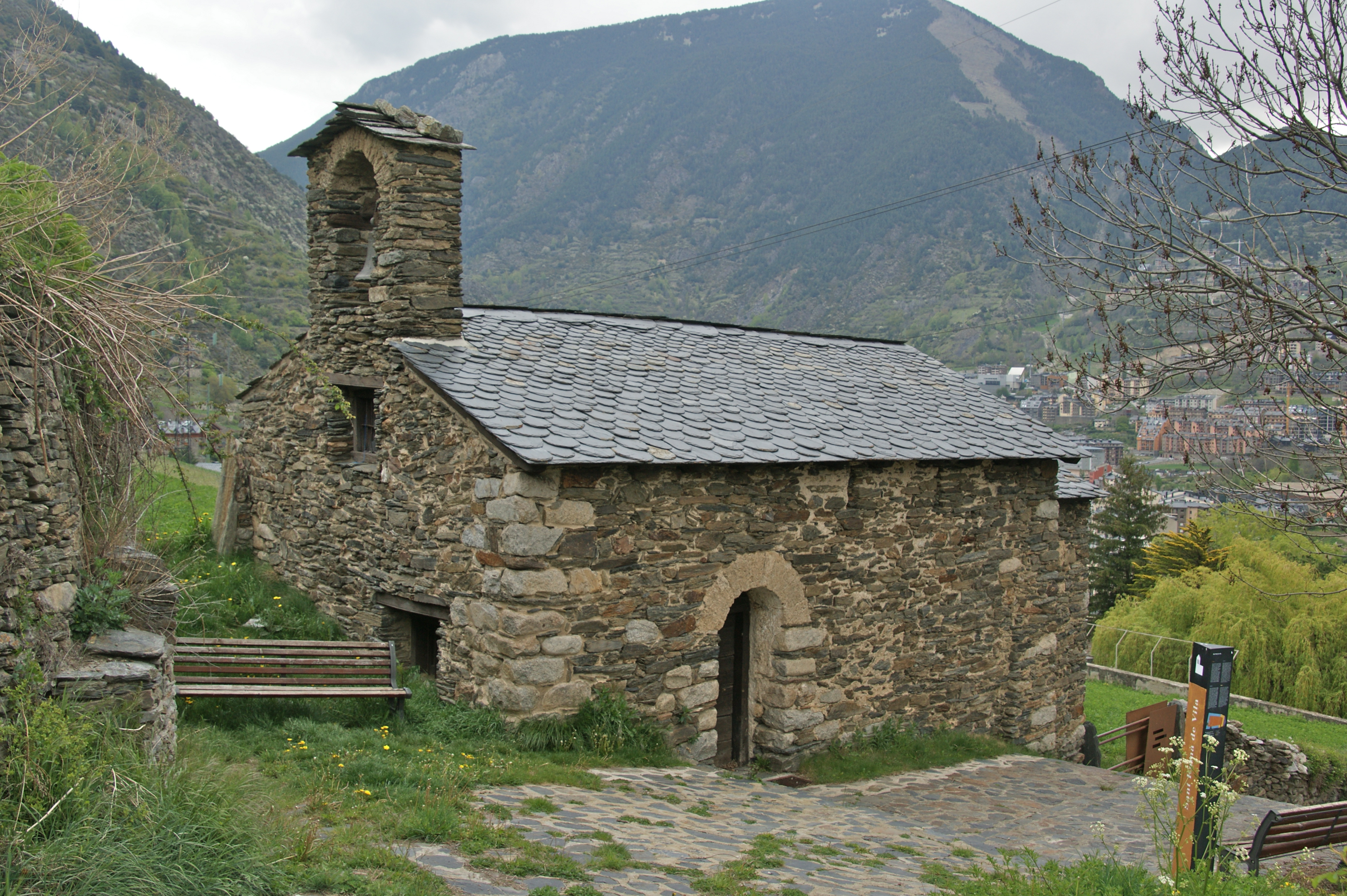
- Església de Sant Romà de Vila

- Location in Andorra
- Coordinates: 42°32′N 1°34′E
- Country: Andorra
- Parish: Encamp
- Elevation: 1,417 m (4,649 ft)

Population (2012)
  - Total: 1,418

Vila (Catalan pronunciation: [ˈbila]) is a village in Andorra, located in the parish of Encamp.
