= Economy of Andorra =

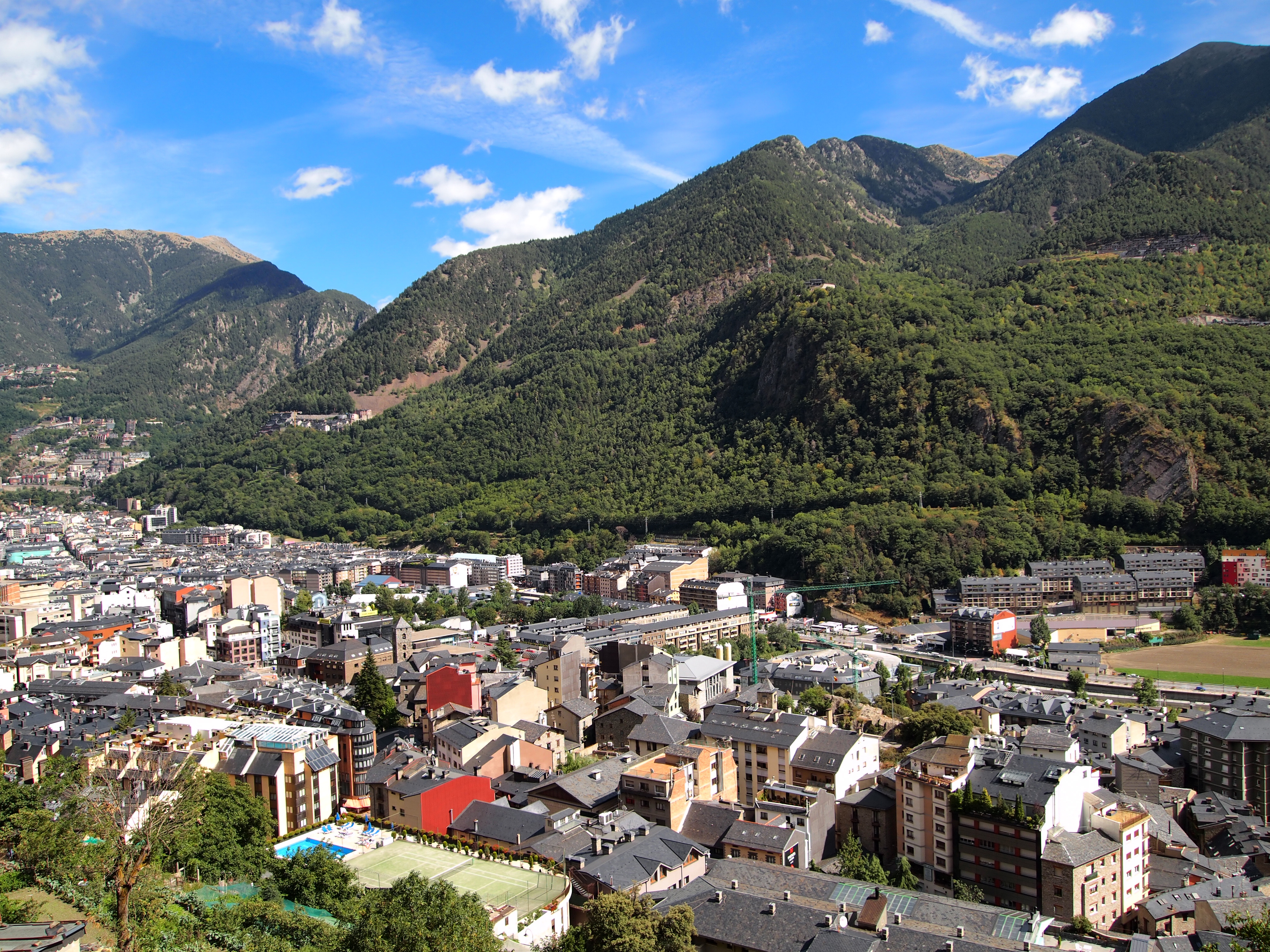
- Andorra la Vella
- Currency: Euro (EUR, €)
- Fiscal year: Calendar year
- Trade organisations: EU Customs Union

Statistics
- Population: ▲77,543 (1 January 2020 est.)
- GDP: ▲$3.73 billion (nominal; 2025) ▲$4.42 billion (PPP; 2025)
- GDP rank: 159th (nominal; 2024); 168th (PPP; 2024)
- GDP growth: ▲8.7% (2022); ▲1.3% (2023f); ▲1.5% (2024f)
- GDP per capita: ▲$54,280 (nominal; 2025) ▲$64,386 (PPP; 2025)
- GDP per capita rank: 24th (nominal; 2024); 18th (PPP; 2024)
- GDP by sector: agriculture 11.9%, industry 33.6%, services 54.5% (2015 est.)
- Inflation (CPI): ▼0.9% (CPI, 2015 est.)
- Population below national poverty line: no data
- Human Development Index: ▲0.884 very high (2022) (35th); ▲0.810 very high IHDI (30th) (2022)
- Labour force: 39,750 (2016)
- Labour force by occupation: agriculture 0.5%, industry 4.4%, services 95.1% (2015)
- Unemployment: ▼3.7% (2016 est.)
- Main industries: tourism (particularly skiing), banking, timber, furniture

External
- Exports: ▲$115 million (2021)
- Export goods: tobacco products, furniture
- Main export partners: france(+)34%, Spain(+) 58% (1998)
- Imports: ▲$1.73 billion (2020)
- Import goods: consumer goods, food, electricity
- Main import partners: Spain 51.5%, France(+) 22.3%, Us(+) 0.3% (2003)

Public finance
- Government debt: $0 (2016)
- Revenue: $403 million (2011)
- Spending: $470 million (2011)
- Economic aid: no data
- Credit rating: A (Domestic); A (Foreign); AAA (T&C Assessment) (Standard & Poor's)
- All values, unless otherwise stated, are in US dollars.

The economy of Andorra is a developed and free market economy driven by finance, retail, and tourism. The country's gross domestic product (GDP) was US$6.00 billion in 2024. Attractive for shoppers from France and Spain as a free port, Andorra also has developed active summer and winter tourist resorts. With some 270 hotels and 400 restaurants, as well as many shops, the tourist trade employs a growing portion of the domestic labour force. An estimated 10 million tourists visit annually.

There is a fairly active trade in consumer goods, including imported manufactured items, which, because they are duty-free, are less expensive in Andorra than in neighboring countries. Andorra's duty-free status also has had a significant effect on the controversy concerning its relationship with the European Union (EU). Its negotiations on duty-free status and relationship with the EU began in 1987, soon after Spain joined. An agreement that went into effect in July 1991 sets duty-free quotas and places limits on certain items – mainly milk products, tobacco products and alcoholic beverages. Andorra is permitted to maintain price differences from other EU countries, and visitors enjoy limited duty-free allowances.

The results of Andorra's elections thus far indicate that many support the government's reform initiatives and believe the country must, to some degree, integrate into the European Union in order to continue to enjoy its prosperity. Although arable land comprises less than 2% of the country, agriculture was the mainstay of the Andorran economy until the upsurge in tourism. Sheep raising has been the principal agricultural activity, but tobacco growing is lucrative. Most of Andorra's food is imported.

In addition to handicrafts, manufacturing includes cigars, cigarettes and furniture for domestic and export markets. A hydroelectric plant at Les Escaldes, with a capacity of 26.5 megawatts, provides 40% of Andorra's electricity; Spain provides the rest.

== Overview ==
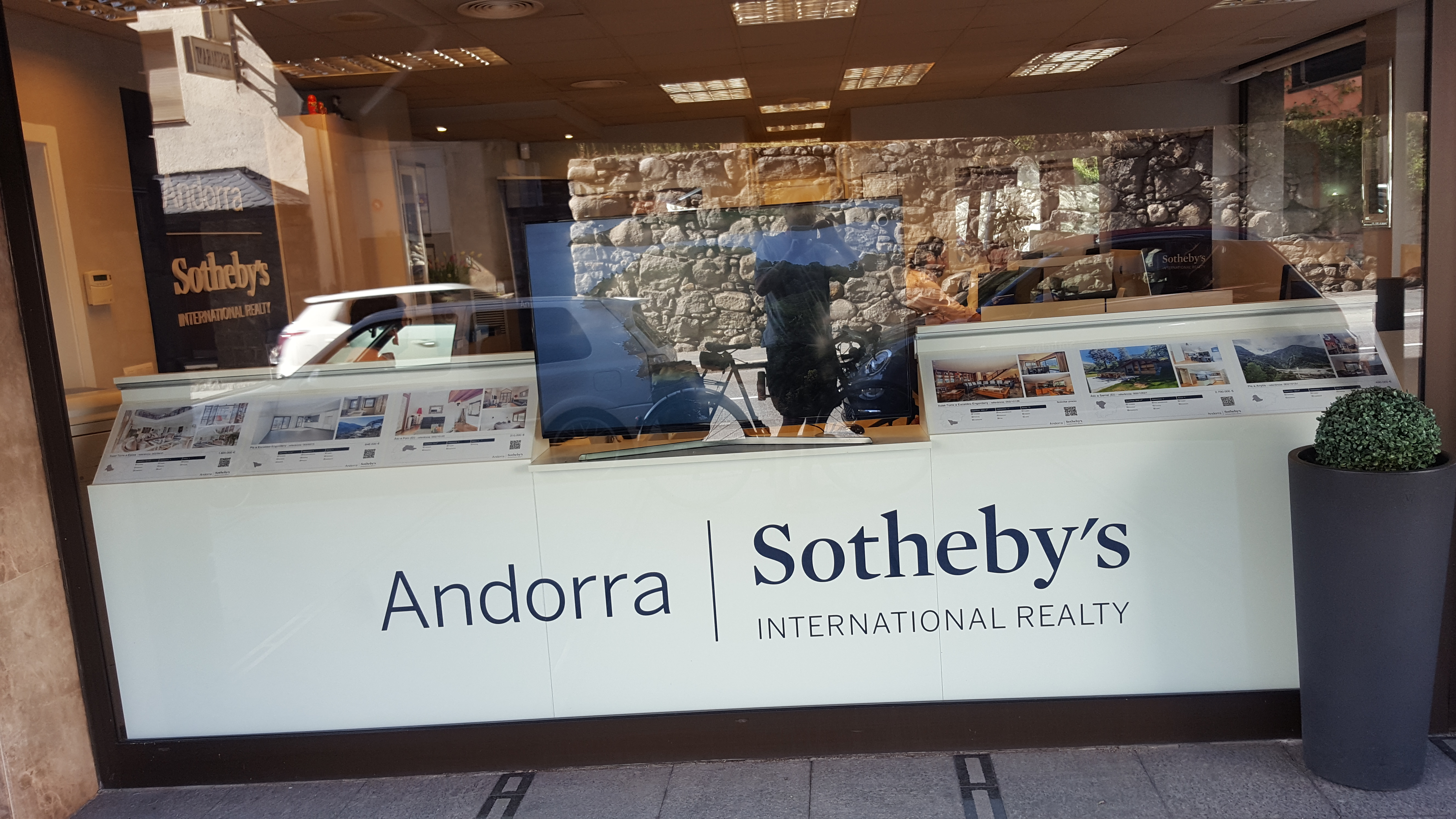
Sotheby's Andorra office

Tourism is the mainstay of Andorra's economy, accounting for roughly 80% of GDP. An estimated 9 million tourists visit annually, attracted by Andorra's duty-free status and by its summer and winter resorts. Andorra's comparative advantage has recently eroded as the economies of neighboring France and Spain have been opened up, providing broader availability of goods and lower tariffs. The banking sector, with its "tax haven" status, also contributes substantially to the economy. Agricultural production is limited by a scarcity of arable land, and most food has to be imported. The principal livestock activity is sheep raising. Manufacturing consists mainly of cigarettes, cigars and furniture. Andorra is a member of the EU Customs Union and is treated as an EU member for trade in manufactured goods (no tariffs).

== Statistics ==
Exports of Andorra by product category (2019) Chemical products Transportation Machines Mineral products Plastics and rubbers Metals Foodstuffs Precious metals Textiles Instruments Animal products Vegetable products Paper goods Footwear and headwear Miscellaneous Stone and glass Wood products Animal and vegetable bi-products Animal hides Arts and antiques Weapons

GDP: purchasing power parity - US$3.327 billion (2015)
country comparison to the world: 190

GDP - real growth rate: 8.95% (2015 est.)
country comparison to the world: 132

GDP - per capita: purchasing power parity - US$49,900 (2015)
country comparison to the world: 29

GDP - composition by sector: (2015 est.)
agriculture: 11.9%
industry: 33.6%
services: 54.5%

Population below poverty line: N/A

Household income or consumption by percentage share:
lowest 10%: N/A
highest 10%: N/A

Inflation rate (consumer prices): -0.9% (2015 est.)
country comparison to the world: 225

Labor force: 42,230 (2007)
country comparison to the world: 185

Labor force - by occupation: agriculture 0.3%, industry 20.8%, services 79% (2007)

Unemployment rate: 3.7%
country comparison to the world: 183

Budget:
revenues: US$1.872 billion
expenditures: US$2.06 billion (2016)

Industries: tourism (particularly skiing), banking, timber, furniture

Industrial production growth rate: -3.9% (2020 est.)
country comparison to the world: 184

Electricity - production: N/A

Electricity - production by source:
fossil fuel: 0%
hydro: 40%
nuclear: 0%
other: 60% imported from Spain

Electricity - consumption: N/A

Electricity - exports: N/A

Electricity - imports: N/A; note - imports electricity from Spain and France; Andorra generates a small amount of hydropower

Agriculture - products: small quantities of rye, wheat, barley, oats, vegetables, tobacco, sheep, cattle

Exports: US$1.842 billion f.o.b. (2020 est.)
country comparison to the world: 163

Exports - commodities: integrated circuits, dental fitting supplies, cars, gold, essential oils (2021)

Exports - partners: Spain 40%, France 19%, United States 11%, Mauritania 5% (2019)

Imports: US$1.727 billion (2020 est.)
country comparison to the world: 178

Imports - commodities: cars, refined petroleum, perfumes, shaving products, liquors (2019)

Imports - partners: Spain 71%, France 17% (2019)

Debt - external: $0 (2016)

Economic aid - recipient: none

Currency: Euros have replaced the French franc and the Spanish peseta.

Exchange rates: euros per US dollar - 0.845 (2021), 0.6827 (2008), 0.7306 (2007), 0.7964 (2006), 0.8041 (2005), 0.8054 (2004), 0.886 (2003), 1.0626 (2002), 1.1175 (2001), 0.9867 (January 2000), 0.9386 (1999)

Fiscal year: calendar year

=== Companies ===
In 2022, the sector with the highest number of companies registered in Andorra is Services with 2,515 companies followed by Retail Trade and Wholesale Trade with 1,157 and 1,144 companies respectively.

== See also ==
- List of exports of Andorra
- Tourism in Andorra
