= Verònica Canals =

Andorran politician

Verònica Canals i Riba

Andorran Minister of Tourism
- In office May 2019 – July 2021
- Succeeded by: Jordi Torres

Personal details
- Born: 29 October 1970 (age 55) Encamp, Andorra
- Party: DA
- Education: University of Strasbourg; HEC Montréal

Verònica Canals i Riba (born 29 October 1970) is an Andorran business manager and politician who served as Minister of Tourism since 21 May 2019 under the Premiership of Xavier Espot.

== Biography ==
Born in Encamp, Canals got a degree in economics from the University of Strasbourg and a master's degree in business management from HEC Montréal. She worked for Adecco in Spain and returned to Andorra to work in Grandvalira-Saetde (the company that manages some of the Andorran ski stations) in 1999, serving as its director of catering and complementary services until 2009, and after that, as its national director until she left her post in summer 2018.

On 21 May 2019, newly elected Prime Minister Xavier Espot named her Minister of Tourism. On 5 May 2021 she announced she was resigning from her post "for strictly personal and family reasons", and would be succeeded by Jordi Torres in July.
