= Estany de l'Illa =

Lake in Andorra

Coordinates: 42°29′52″N 1°39′30″E

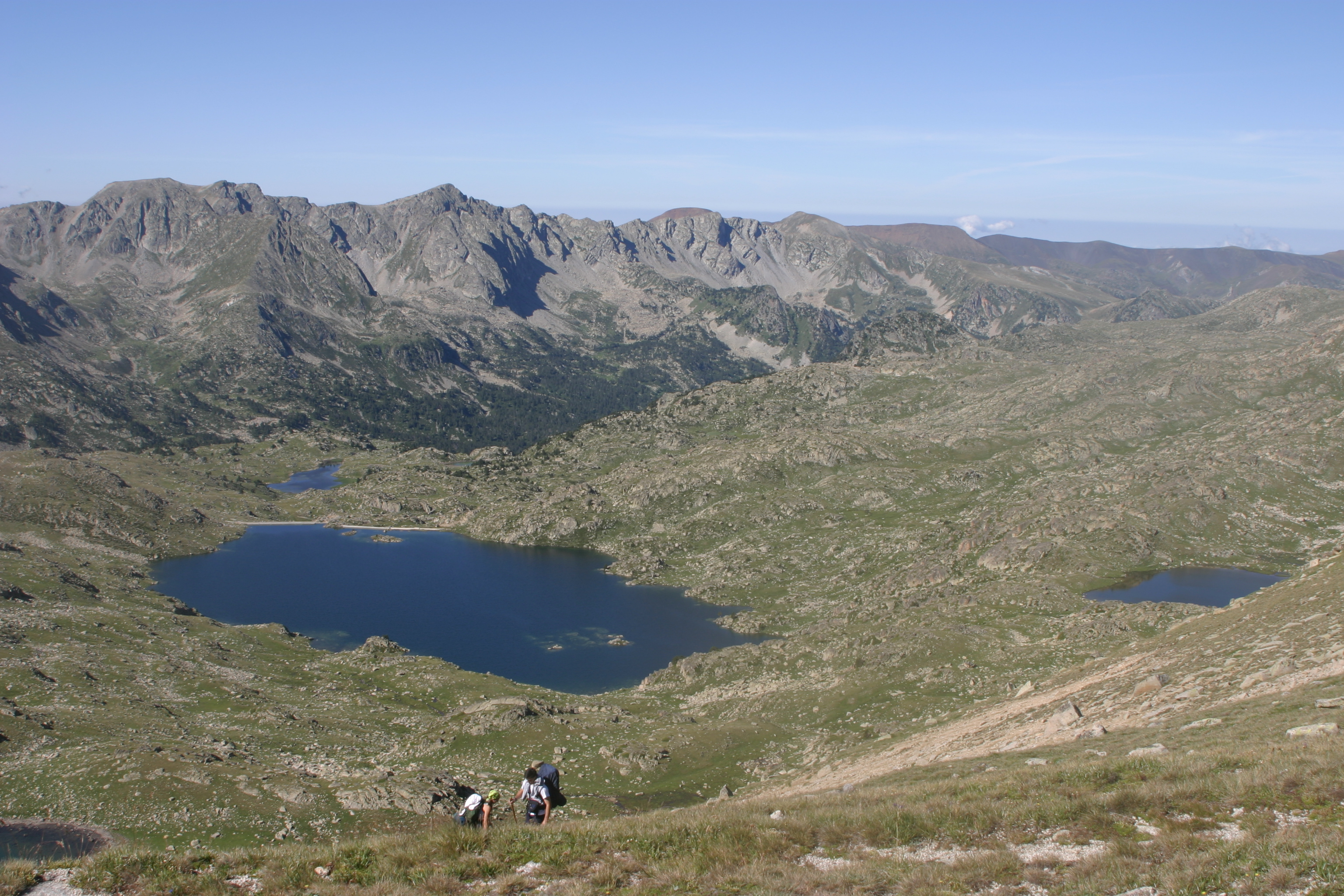
Estany de l'Illa

Estany de l'Illa (meaning "Island Lake/Pond" in Catalan) is a small glacial lake and dam situated in the Gargantillar hills, in the Madriu-Perafita-Claror Valley, in the Parish of Encamp, Andorra. It lies at an altitude of 2,515 metres (8,251 ft) and has an area of about 13 hectares (32 acres), and is sourced by the Madriu River. It lies along a popular hiking route during the summer months, which commences at the Grau Roig and crosses the Portella dels Pessons. The dam at Estany de l'Illa was completed in 1955, and a refuge to the southwest of the lake was built in the 1990s.

== Geography ==
The lake is situated in the Gargantillar hills, in the Madriu-Perafita-Claror Valley, in the Parish of Encamp in eastern Andorra, near the border with Spain. The name of the lake is derived from its small central islet, Isla Bacives. The lake, at an altitude of 2,515 metres (8,251 ft), is sourced by the Madriu River, a tributary of the Valira d’Orient River and has an area of about 13 hectares (32 acres).

There are several smaller lakes/ponds nearby: Estany D'Encamp, the largest, is roughly 230 metres (750 ft) to the north, followed by Estany Rodó, which is roughly 330 metres (1,080 ft) to the southwest of Estany de l'Illa, just southwest of the refuge.

Estany de l'Illa is along a popular hiking route during the summer months which starts at Grau Roigski area, traverses several lakes in the Pessons cirque, crosses Portella dels Pessons, and then descends to Estany de l’Illa via the GR7.

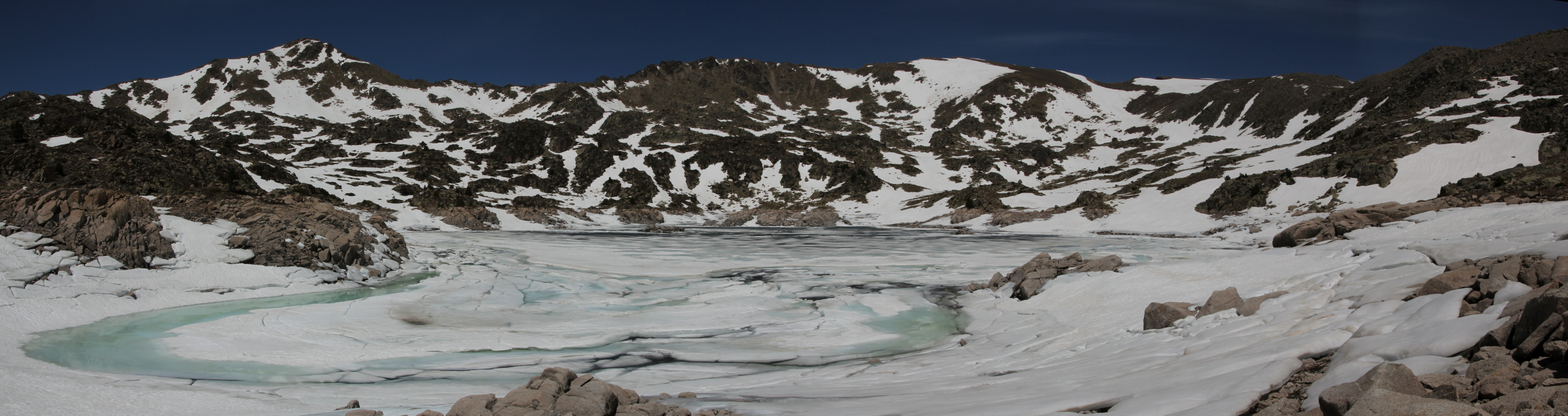
Panorama of the lake, frozen over in the winter

== Dam and refuge ==
Construction of the dam began in 1947 and it was completed in 1955.

Since the 1980s, Estany de l'Illa has been used as a refuge. Refugi de l’Illa, situated 156 metres (512 ft) southwest of the lake, replaced the original unmanned shelter in the 1990s.
