= Peripheral radio =

Radio station broadcasting to France from outside the country

A peripheral radio (in French: Radio périphérique) is a radio station that could be listened to in France until 1981, yet was independent of Radio France and located outside of France. Among these stations are RTL from Luxembourg, Europe 1 from Germany, Sud Radio and Radio Andorra from Andorra, RMC from Monaco and Radio Océan/Atlantic 2000 from Spain.

== History ==
The creation of peripheral radios in France in the 1930s is linked to the threat of a ban on private radio stations. In order to protect their investments, French private promoters installed transmitters in neighboring countries that offered a more friendly environment in legislation and taxation.

In 1945, the French state established a monopoly over radio, making private radio stations banned from transmitting on French territory. Therefore, only peripheral radio stations remained, which location made it possible to escape French regulations.

Despite the location of their transmitters, the studios and even the head offices of these stations could be in France, especially since the French State most often participated in the capital of these radio stations with companies like Sofirad.

For French audiences, the peripheral radio stations provided additional sources of news and entertainment, considered to be less subject to control by the government. During the protests of May 1968, the coverage of the event by peripheral radio stations was considered as more reliable and impartial that the one provided by the state-run radio, transmitting live from the streets and giving voice to the leaders of the movement, like Daniel Cohn-Bendit and Alain Geismar.

The state monopoly over radio ended in 1981, allowing the creation of several private stations in the FM band. In this way, the role of peripheral radio was reduced, although some of these stations are currently in operation.

== Sources ==
- Aplin, R.; Montchamp, J. (2014). "Radio périphérique". Dictionary of Contemporary France. Contemporary Country Dictionaries. Taylor & Francis. ISBN 978-1-135-93653-2.

== See also ==
- Border blaster
- International broadcasting
- Pirate radio
