= List of exports of Andorra =

Exports of Andorra by product category (2019) Chemical products Transportation Machines Mineral products Plastics and rubbers Metals Foodstuffs Precious metals Textiles Instruments Animal products Vegetable products Paper goods Footwear and headwear Miscellaneous Stone and glass Wood products Animal and vegetable bi-products Animal hides Arts and antiques Weapons

The following is a list of the exports of Andorra.

Data is for 2018, in millions of United States dollars, as reported by The Observatory of Economic Complexity. Currently the top ten exports are listed.

#	Product	Value
1	Integrated Circuits	23,660
2	Cars	16,410
3	Essential Oils	14,276
4	Orthopedic Appliances	12,099
5	Gold	3,848
6	Cigarette Paper	3,610
7	Plastic Housewares	3,400
8	Blank Audio Media	3,082
9	Base Metal Watches	3,065
10	Computers	3,023

== See also ==
- Economy of Andorra
