= Grau Roig =

Ski resort in Encamp, Andorra

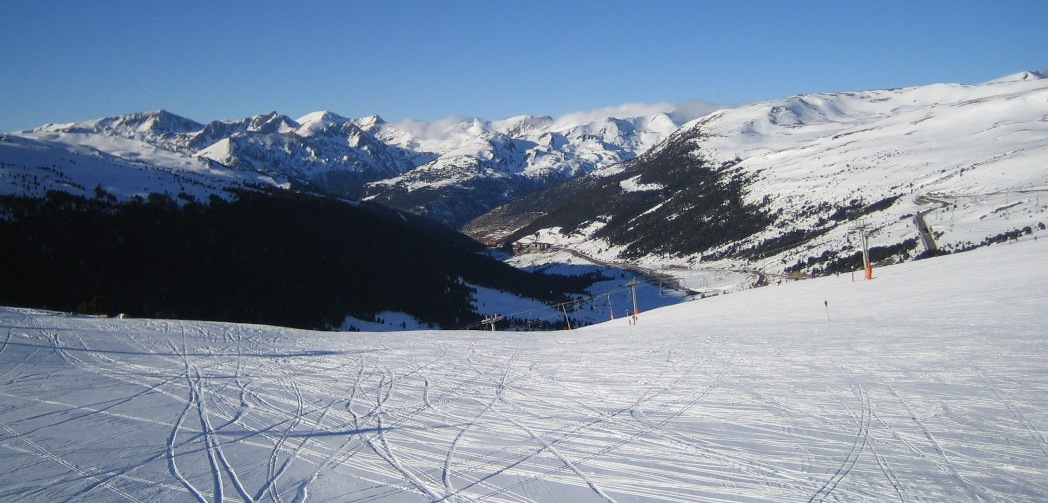
- Grau Roig and the valley of the Valira d'Orient surrounded by Pyrenean peaks

- Location in Andorra
- Coordinates: 42°31′59″N 1°42′4″E
- Country: Andorra
- Parish: Encamp

Grau Roig (Catalan pronunciation: [ˈɡɾaw ˈrɔtʃ]) is a sector of the Grandvalira ski resort in Andorra, located in the parishes of Canillo and Encamp. It includes alpine skiing and cross-country skiing tracks. It is the only sector in Grandvalira which does not have a populated settlement. The nearest major settlement is Pas de la Casa, to the east on the border with France.

A hiking trail commences here, and is the access route to the Estany de l'Illa.

Grau Roig placing it in the northeastern part of Andorra within the Eastern Pyrenees. This high-altitude area lies primarily in the parishes of Canillo and Encamp, where it occupies a strategic position along the CS-280 road connecting key access points in the region.
