= Lake Engolasters =

Lake in Encamp, Andorra

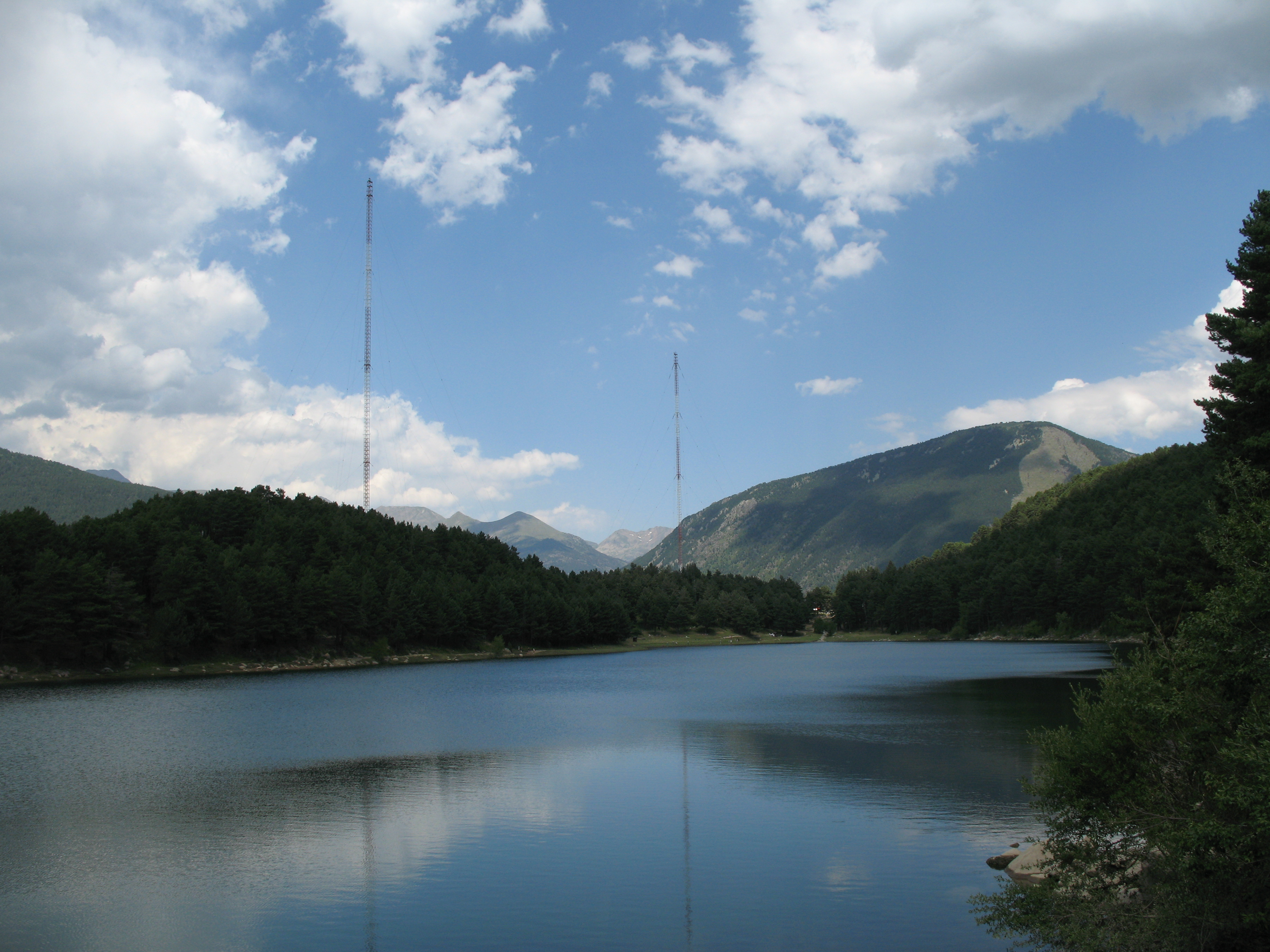
- Lake Engolasters with radio towers

- Location within Andorra
- Location: Encamp, Andorra
- Coordinates: 42°31′11″N 1°34′7″E
- Type: glacial
- Basin countries: Andorra
- Average depth: 10 m (33 ft)
- Shore length^{1}: 2 km (1.2 mi)
- Surface elevation: 1,616 metres (5,302 ft)
- ^{1} Shore length is not a well-defined measure.

Lake Engolasters, in the Encamp parish of Andorra, is an oblong shaped lake at an elevation of 1,616 m (5,302 ft). formed in a glacial depression. It is located close to Andorra La Vella, the capital of Andorra.

The lake water is deep blue and is drained by a drainage basin formed by the Pyrenees mountain ranges, which are snow-covered. The valley formed by the rivers draining the catchment provides an enchanting view with green meadows and rich forest of pine trees nearer to the lake periphery. The water source to the lake is from the East Valira and Madriu rivers. The stored water in the reservoir is utilized for generating hydroelectric power at the power station located near Encamp village. There is a cable car rope way from Encamp to the lake area, which is a 6.2 kilometres (3.9 mi) line.

== Legend ==
A legend related to the history and formation of the lake claims that Engolasters was formed by a sudden gush of water unleashed by divine powers in order to chastise the impiety of a beautiful woman, who was said to be an ancient inhabitant of a village close to the lake shore. According to legend, the woman refused to give a piece of a bread to a starving pilgrim, said to be Christ himself. Legend also tells that all the stars in the sky, illuminated by the beauty of lake, were destined to fall to the lake bed and stay there as prisoners for eternity.

Another interesting legend narrated is of Engolasters Lake as the site of ceremonies held by witches (said to be a common belief in the Pyrenees). These ceremonies were held in the form of naked dances performed by the witches on the precincts of the lake. People were scared to watch these ceremonies as it was believed that anyone watching these performances would be turned into a dog or stone by the witches.

== Geography ==
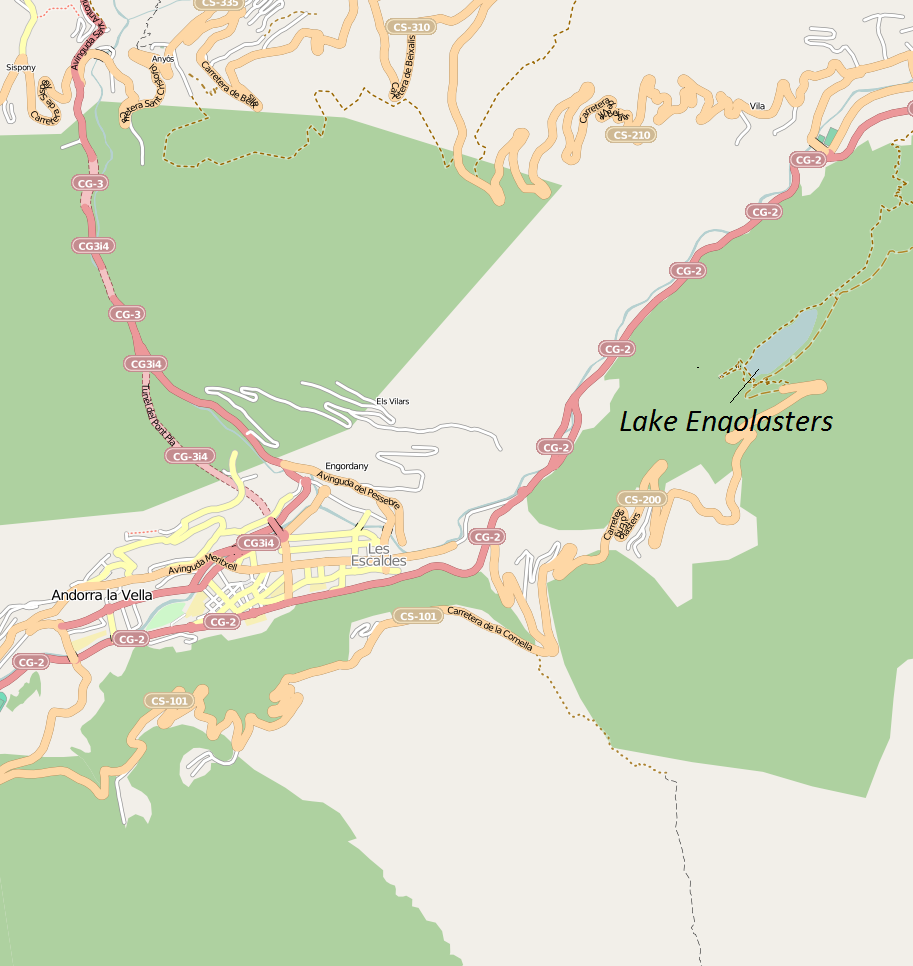
Map showing lake and Andorra la Vella location

Engolasters Lake lies to the northeast of the Andorran capital of Andorra la Vella in western-central Andorra. The Valira River (Riu Valira) drains into the lake. It has two major tributaries, the North Valira and East Valira, which have created a deep incised valley. The two tributaries' confluence at Escaldes forms the Valira River. This river has provided the only access to Andorra along its course, from Spain and from France along the East Valira.

The extreme temperatures recorded at the lake are −21 °C (−6 °F) and a maximum of 39 °C (102 °F).

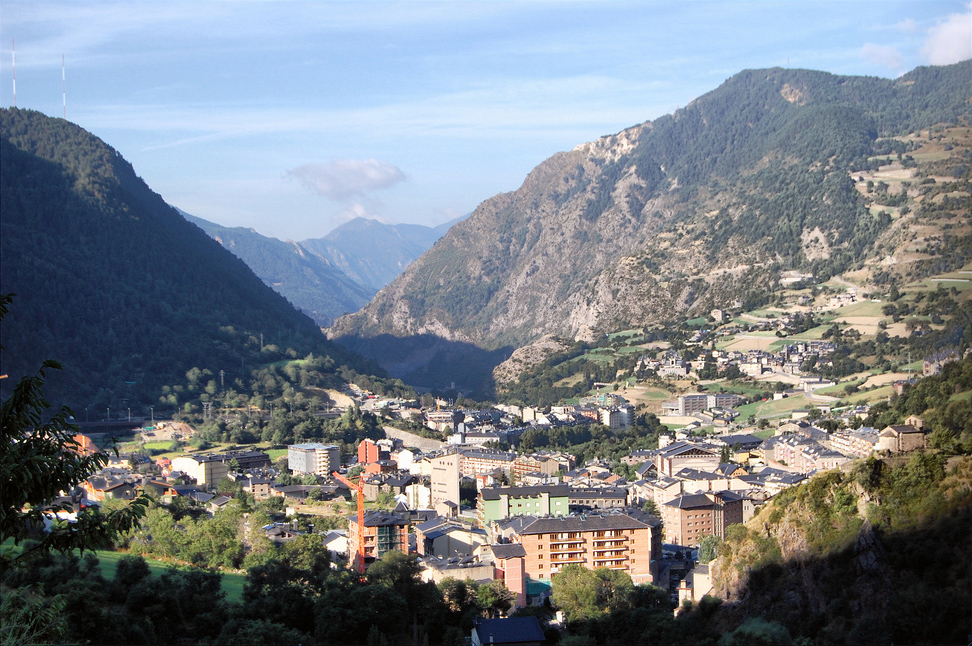
Encamp

The nearest village to the lake is Encamp, which is approached by a dirt road. At the lower gondola station, a 500 m (1,600 ft) road leads to the "Cortals d'Encamp." From this location a drive of about 2.5 km (1.6 mi) leads to a bridge and farm houses and a further 500 m (1,600 ft) drive after crossing the bridge leads to the starting point of the easy climb of 130 m (430 ft), which passes through a tunnel for pedestrians and ends on the right bank of the lake. The walk along the periphery of the lake provides excellent vistas of pine forests amidst mountainous landscape.

(The Cable car stopped operating in the 80's) Cable cars provide one of the means of transport in Andorra and one such cable car way operates between Encamp and Engolasters Lake. A north–south highway links Andorra la Vella, capital city of Andorra, with Spain and France. Encamp is 6 km (3.7 mi) from the capital city and the lake is a further 6.2 km (3.9 mi) by cable way.

Botanical gardens covering three delimited areas representing 13 different habitats are seen along the 3 km (1.9 mi) stretch of the road that connects les Pardines with Engolasters Lake.

== Attractions ==
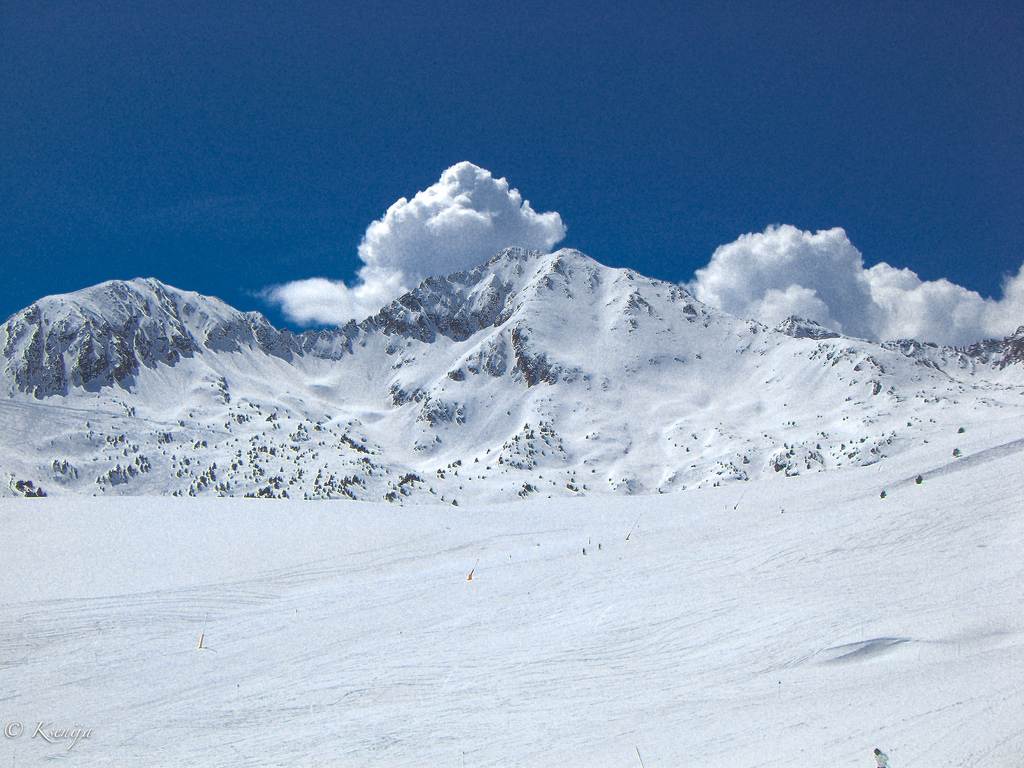
Snow-covered mountains, a major attraction

Tourism is major economic activity around the lake as can be seen from the 88 hotels located in the precincts of the lake. Engolasters Lake is used for recreation purposes. The shoreline of the lake is a popular 2 mi (3.2 km) stretch for hikers. Nearby is the Romanesque Sant Miquel d’Engolasters hermitage which towers over the lake. The Lombard bell tower is dated to the 12th century and it contained Romanesque paintings, which now adorn the walls of the Romanesque art museum of Barcelona. Documents dated to 1162 and 1176 have revealed that at the time there was a settlement in this vicinity. Fario trout and salmon are the popular fish varieties in the lakes of Andorra and Engolasters reserve is stated to be not only a delight for mountaineers but also for trout fishing. There is also a small zipline park near the lake.

=== Hydroelectric station ===
In the year 1929, Andorra decided to exploit the hydropower potential of its rivers and lakes. Accordingly, Andorra’s General Council awarded the work to Forces Andorranes Societat Anonima (FASA), a private industrial development company (owned by French and Spanish groups). It was built with the storage provided by Engolasters Lake at Salt d'Escaldes. The powerhouse was set up in the Encamp valley below the lake with an installation of two units of 7.2 MW capacity each.

A rock fill dam built at the southern end of the lake has created the lake which has a depth of about 10 m. It is one of the largest water reservoirs created by the dam at the outlet of the lake. The lake waters are rich in minerals such as iron, magnesium and sulfur and some of them have medicinal value.

The power station was built between 1931 and 1934. Commissioned in August 1934, the energy generated was initially exported mostly to Spain, and also in later years to France and other places. Since the project was built under a concession given to FASA as an exchange for building of roads, the country was opened up for industrial development once the roads got built. Consequently, the demand for power increased within the country, and as per reports, the energy from this power project now meets only 15% of the country’s total consumption.

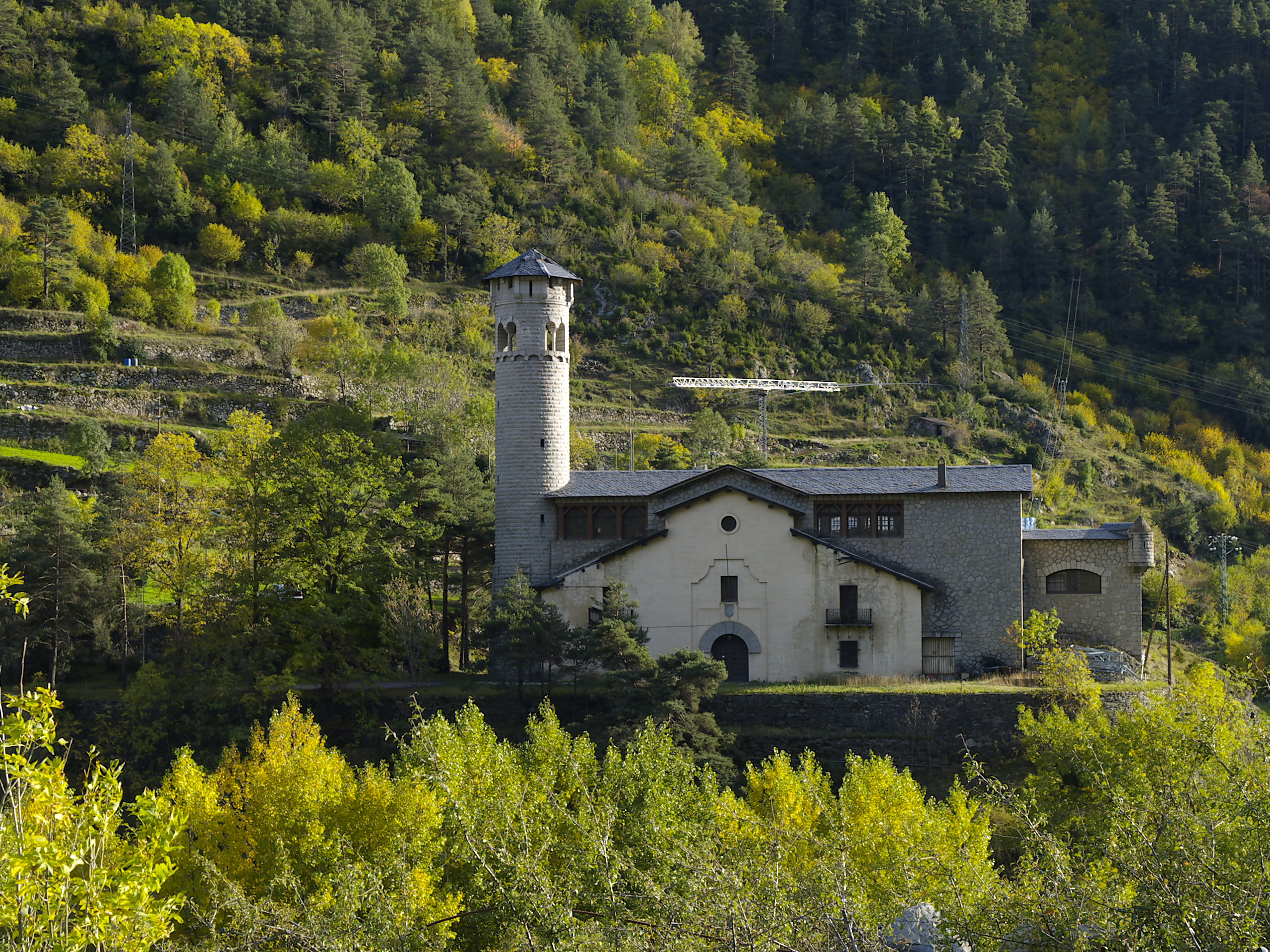
Radio station in the valley below the lake now abandoned

== Radio tower ==
The transmission tower seen on the bank of the lake was the 1938 creation of journalist Jacques Tremoulet and radio manufacturer Leon Kierkowsky, to operate a radio station Radio Andorra from Andorra amidst controversy over transmission rights. This antenna tower was erected over 400 ft (120 m) pylons. Its foundation was not based on rocks but on copper-bound and earth-filled piers. The radio station from which they transmitted music programmes at 60,000 watts of power is located in the valley below the lake to reach listeners not only in Andorra but also England, Italy and France.

After transmission started on 7 August 1939, there was a series of controversies over the transmission rights accorded to the radio station. It was shut down on 9 April 1981. The transmission tower today stands unused on the lake periphery.
