= Radio Andorra =

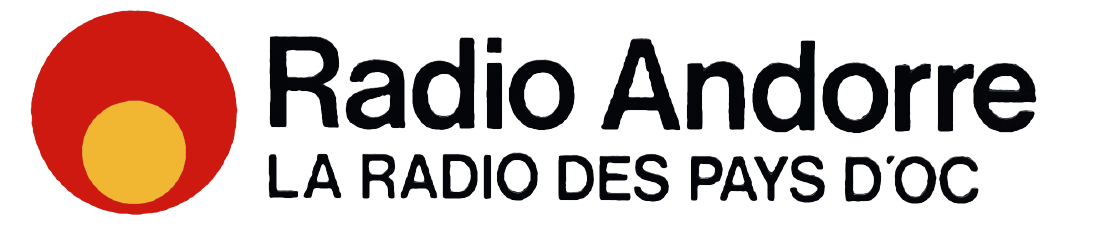
- Andorra
- Broadcast area: Andorra; France; Spain
- Branding: La radio des pays d'Oc (French); ¡Aquí Radio Andorra! Emisora del Principado de Andorra (Spanish); Aquí Ràdio Andorra! (Catalan)

Programming
- Languages: Catalan; French; Spanish
- Format: Music radio

Ownership
- Owner: Jacques Trémoulet
- Operator: Radiophonie du Midi

History
- First air date: 7 August 1939; 87 years ago
- Last air date: 26 March 1981; 45 years ago

Technical information
- Transmitter coordinates: 42.5287°N 1.5698°E

Radio Andorra (Ràdio Andorra in Catalan or Radio Andorre in French) was a commercial radio station that broadcast by concession of the authorities from the Principality of Andorra between 1939 and 1981.

Thanks to the neutrality of the Principality during World War II, Radio Andorra became the only private European radio station broadcasting in French during the conflict without being under direct orders from France or Germany. Likewise it became the only radio station to conserve its independence after the war ended, despite the strong pressure from the Gallic authorities received by the Andorran government.

== History ==
=== Beginnings and early years ===
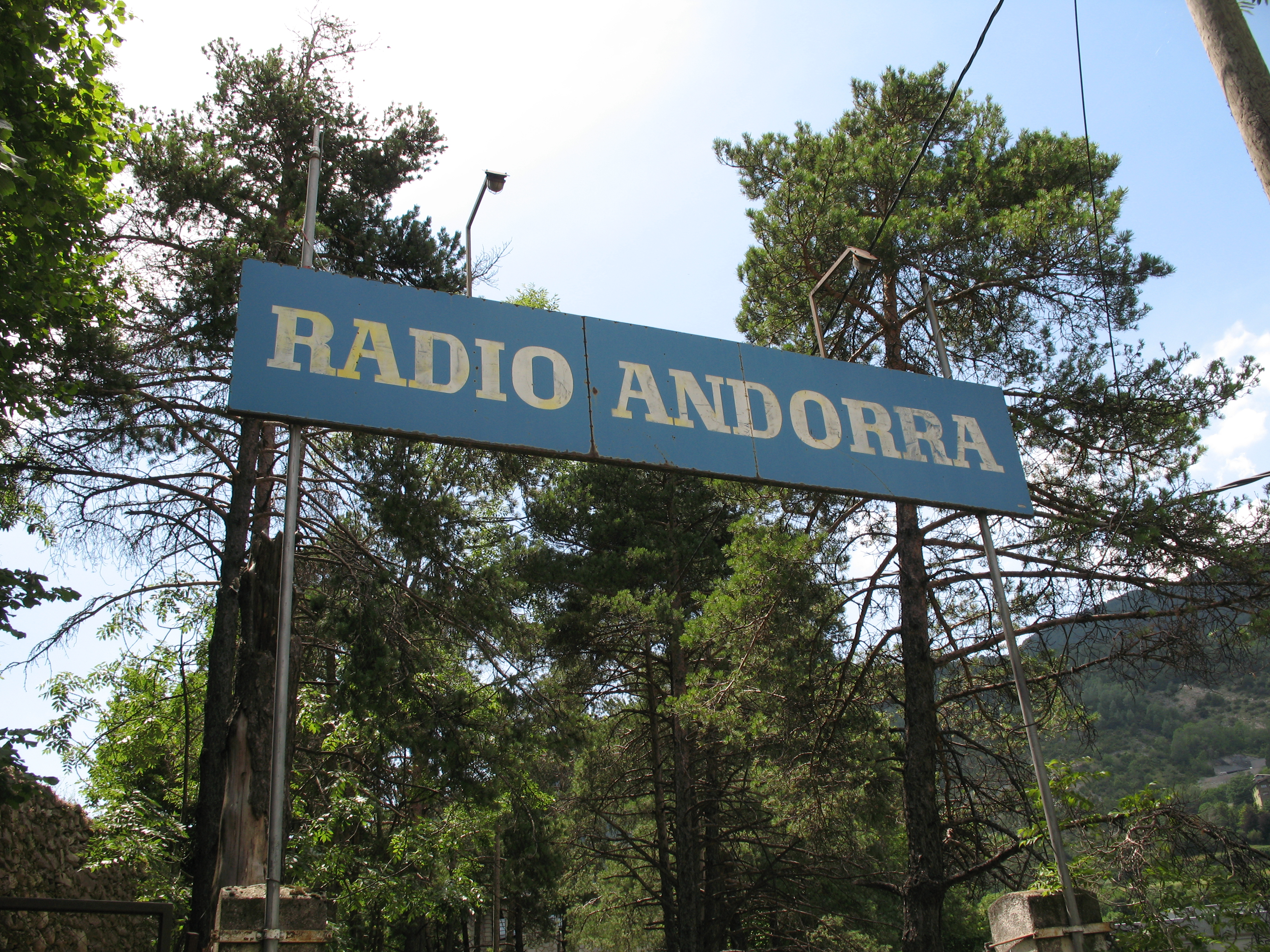
Radio Andorra signpost at Encamp

Broadcasting began on 7 August 1939. Jacques Trémoulet, who was also the owner of the broadcasting company Radiophonie du Midi and had already broadcast in Toulouse, Montpellier, Bordeaux and Agen, created Radio Andorra fearing the civil interdiction of the private radio in French territory, due to the fact that, if it had been produced, it would have silenced the rest of radio stations of his property, more particularly Radio Toulouse, very popular then.

The particular status that the Principality had, a theoretically independent state but in practice closely linked to France and Spain in the 1930s, allowed to escape the broadcasting regulations of these two countries. Unfortunately for the station, just a month after its commissioning, France declared war on Nazi Germany. After some hesitation and a brief interruption of the emissions, the station resumed broadcasting on April 3, 1940, with no more interruptions for more than forty years.

From 1940 to 1944, Radio Andorra was the only private French-speaking radio station that broadcast without the supervision of either the Allies or the Germans. Jacques Trémoulet's other private stations located in France were under the orders of the Vichy government. Trémoulet appointed Etienne Laffont as the director of the station. He was the grandson of Paul Laffont, who supported the creation of the station before the war. The attempts to control the station during this period were many, but the station overcame them. It is, with the liberation of France in 1944, when the real hardships began for Radio Andorra. Its owner, Trémoulet, was sentenced to death for being a collaborator with the Nazi occupation forces. Trémoulet took refuge in Spain and later in Switzerland until 1949, when he was finally pardoned.

Radio Andorra was heavily unstable during the second part of the decade: an interference emitter, installed by the French government in Bordeaux made it became practically inaudible on French soil for almost a year until the practice was declared illegal by the Court of Paris. Jacques Trémoulet's sequestration of assets in France, particularly the advertising management of the station, based in Paris, prevented him from accessing French advertisers, which is why advertising revenues were very little.

=== 1950s to 1970s ===
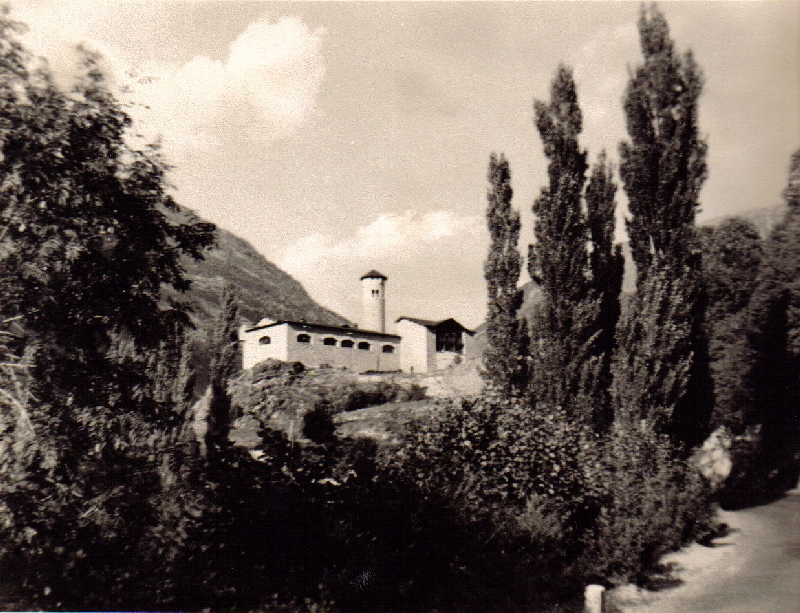
Radio Andorra transmission station in Encamp (July 1961)

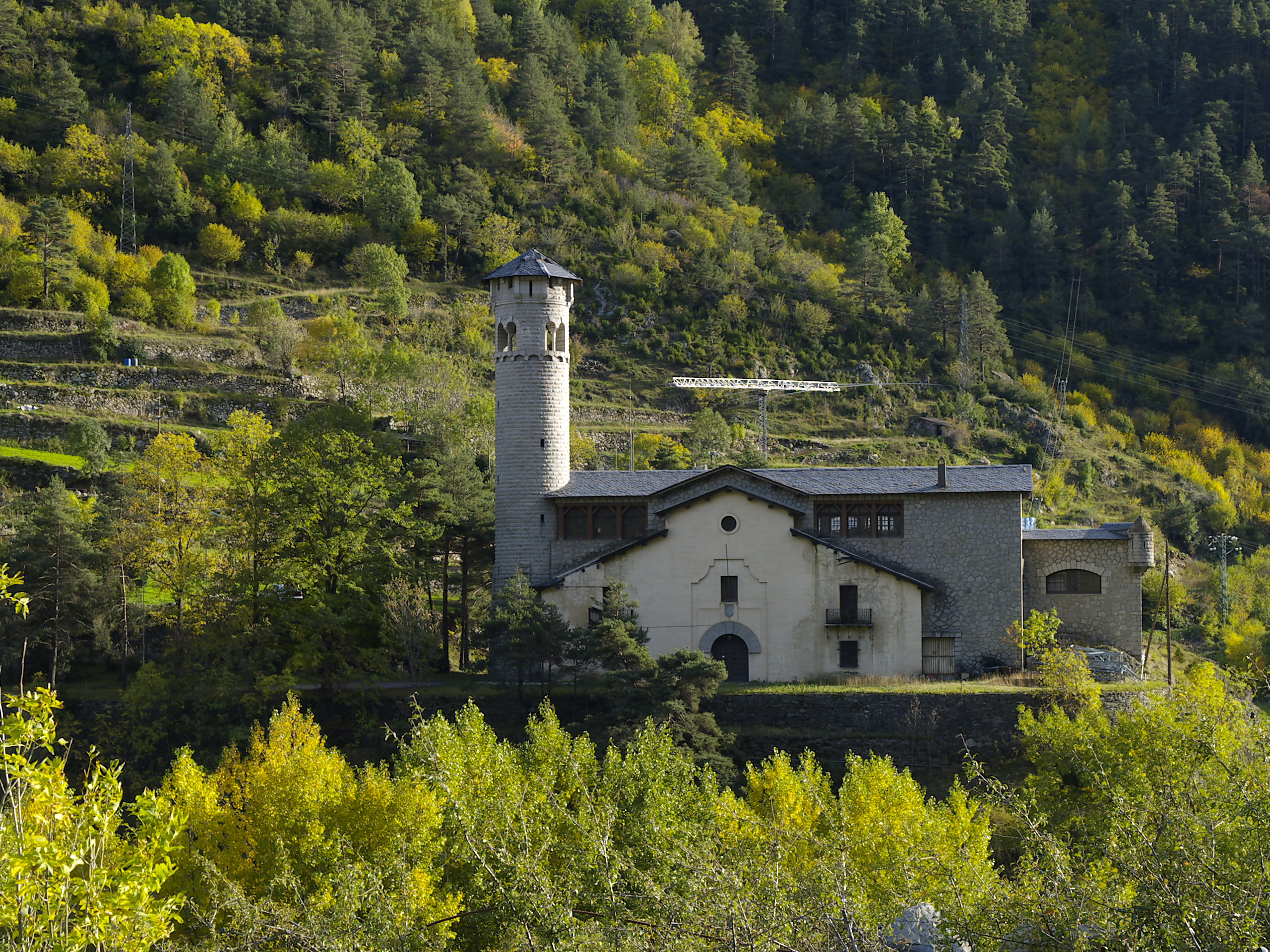
The now abandoned station, in the valley below Lake Engolasters (2006)

Despite the fact that the intentional interference against its owner had already ended, in the early 1950s, pressure from the French government continued with the objective of reducing Radio Andorra to nothing. Administrative obstacles, closure of the Andorran border to prevent the shipment of records, press campaigns ... it was all in vain: Radio Andorra continued to enjoy popularity among its listeners. With that stability, he was finally able to improve the quality of his listening and spend time improving its shows and finding advertising benefits.

Despite the fact that its listening area was smaller than before, it could be heard throughout France (where not even Radio Luxembourg or Europe 1) and was one of the most popular stations. Because of it, France decided to create a new peripheral station that would compete with Radio Andorra in its own geographical area. After numerous incidents with the Andorran authorities, an agreement was reached in order to create this new station in Andorra, obtaining the same concession as Radio Andorra. In 1958, this station controlled by the French State through SOFIRAD, began broadcasting as Radio des Vallées (Radio from the Valleys), a name that later changed to Sud Radio (South radio).

During the 1960s, the fight between Radio Andorra and its opponent, Radio des Vallées d'Andorre, was fierce. The two were waging a feverish struggle for leadership. The programs were regularly renewed to adapt them according to the trends of the moment, especially the ones concerning the youth. Unfortunately for Radio Andorra, SOFIRAD, a state-owned company that controlled Europe 1, Radio Monte Carlo and Sud Radio (formerly Radio des Vallées d'Andorre), provided the last one with means way better than to those available for the Pyrenean station. In 1968, for the first time, Radio Andorra was surpassed in audience by Sud Radio, losing its leadership position in the south of France, which it would never regain.

In 1971, Jacques Trémoulet, owner and founder of Radio Andorra, passed away. The station then contemplated an approach tactic with RTL, particularly in terms of programming. But these deals would be limited and the decline continued. Radio Andorra did not have the capacity to invest in competitive material and its outdated transmitter did not allow it to be audible outside a very limited geographical area around Andorra.

=== The end of Radio Andorra ===
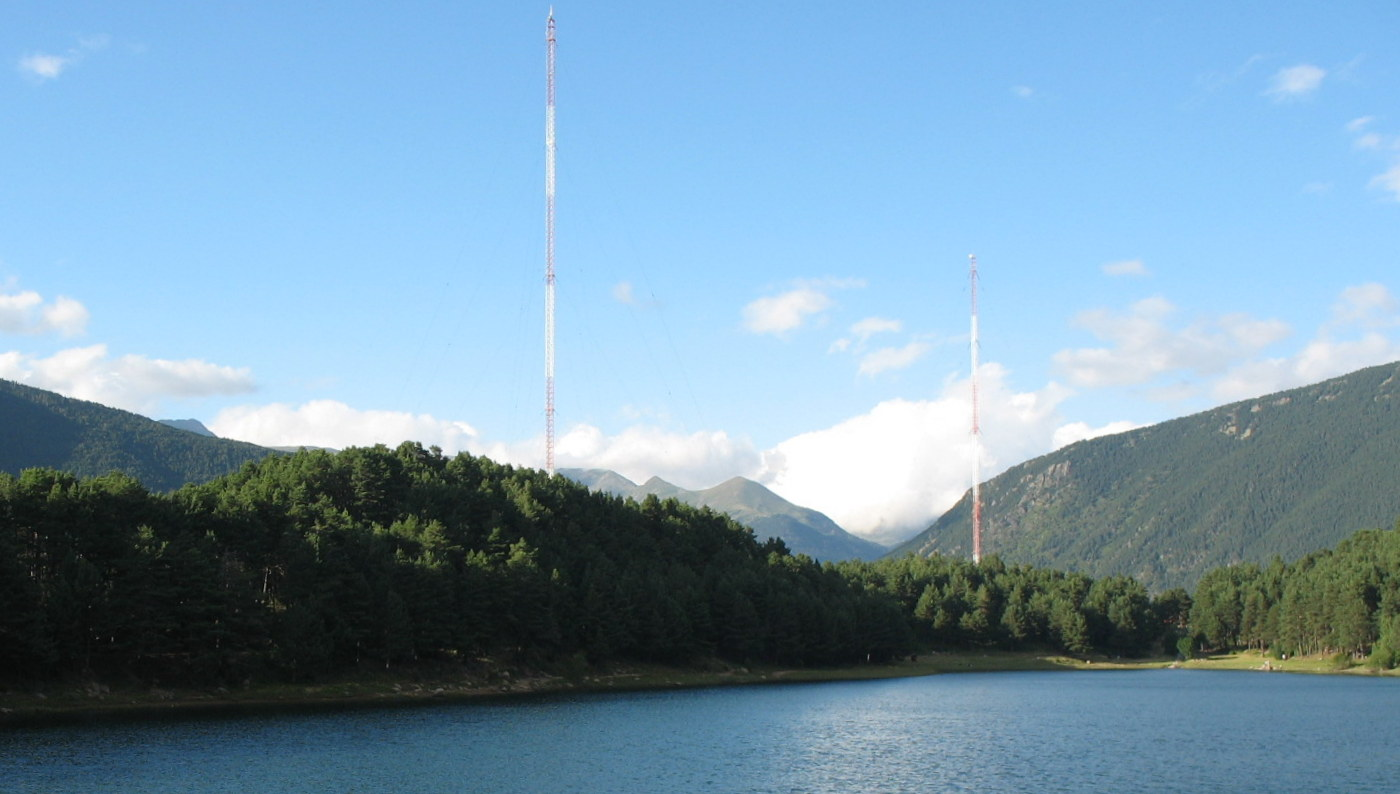
The radio masts of Radio Andorra, pictured in 2010, still not dismantled

On June 26, 1980, the General Council of Andorra, and the Government of the Principality, confirmed its intention not to renew the concession granted in 1961 to Radio Andorra and Sud Radio, which expired in March 1981. The Andorran state wanted to nationalize the radio broadcasting, considering that it was too closely linked to the French and Spanish states. On 26 March 1981, they ordered both stations to immediately cease broadcasting. Radio Andorra executed the order at 9:00 p.m. that same day. Sud Radio did not submit to the order and continued broadcasting for a while longer before retreating into French territory, where free stations were beginning to gain popularity.

Despite an attempt to relaunch in 1984 (which would fail after three months), Radio Andorra did not broadcast again. After this event, the radio waves from Andorra were completely silent for ten years, when Radio Nacional d'Andorra (National Radio of Andorra) broadcast its first program in 1991. However, the transmission towers of Radio Andorra are still standing, on the lake of Engolasters in Encamp.

== Logos and identities ==
Broadcasts in French:

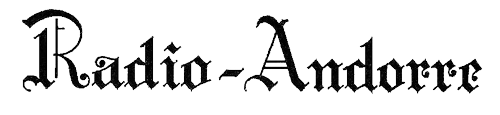
1939 to 1951

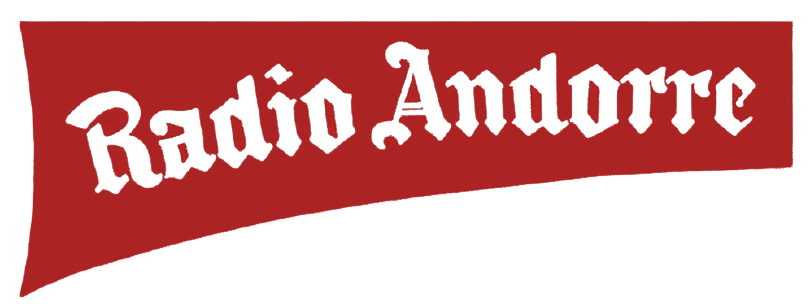
1951 to 1961

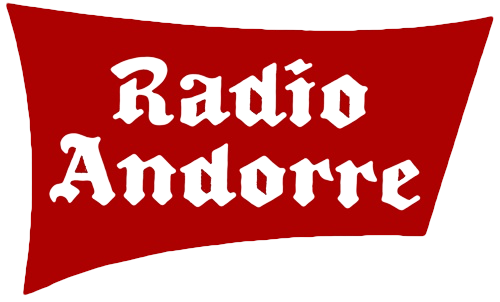
1961 to 1976

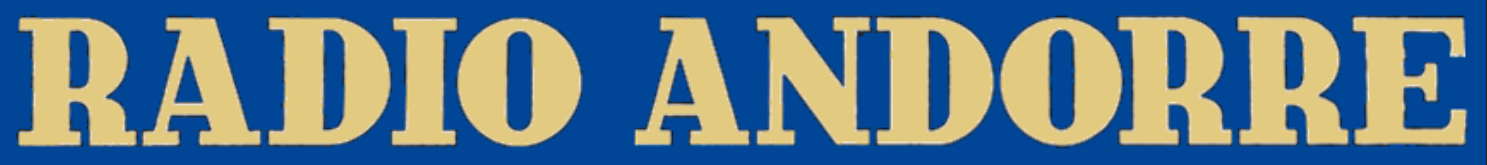
1976 to October 1977

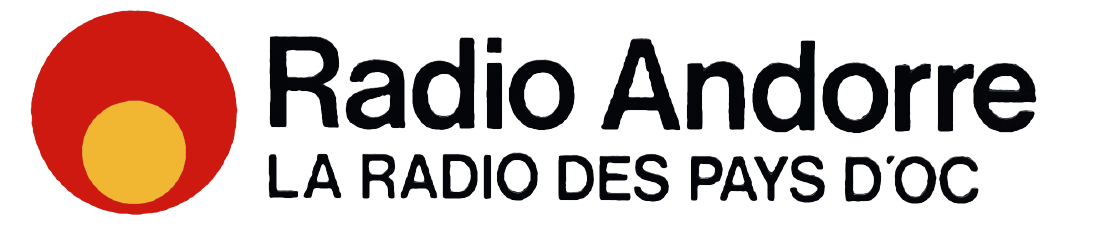
1977 to 1981

Broadcasts in Spanish (until 1977) and Catalan:

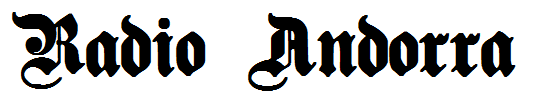
1939 to 1977

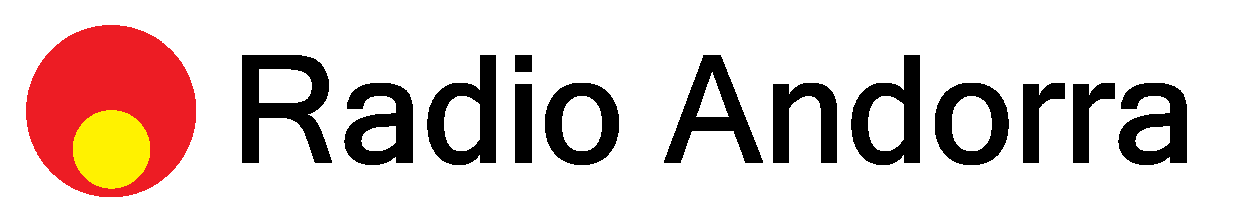
1977 to 1981

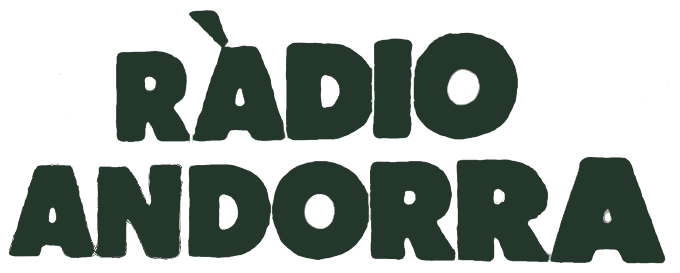
1984
