= Caixa Andorrana de Seguretat Social =

Social Security system in Andorra

The Caixa Andorrana de Seguretat Social (CASS) is the public institution in charge of the Social Security system in Andorra. It was established in April 1968. Since the Constitution of Andorra was approved in 1993, the objective of the Andorran system is to implement Article 30: «The right to health protection and to receive benefits to meet other personal needs is recognized. To these ends, the State will guarantee a Social Security system ». That is to say, guarantee protection, in its contributory and non-contributory modality, of insured persons, direct or indirect, through the appropriate benefits. It is compulsory for salaried workers and also for those who develop an economic activity.

== Branches of the CASS ==
Social security is made up of two different branches or strands of protection:

- General branch covers reimbursement, temporary disability, maternity, paternity, risk during pregnancy, disability, capital death benefits and orphan's pensions.
- Retirement branch covers the situation of loss of income due to cessation of work or economic activity derived from age and is made up of the retirement pension and temporary and lifetime widow's pensions.

== Social Security contributions ==
=== Salaried workers' contributions ===
The Andorran law establishes that for salaried employees the CASS must collect the 22% of their gross monthly salary. The amount collected is divided between worker and employer:

- Workers must allocate 6.5% of gross monthly salary to the coffers of the CASS 3% to the general branch and 3.5% in the retirement branch
- The company must contribute 15.5% salary (7% for the general branch and 8.5% for retirement)

The company is responsible for paying monthly amounts directly to the CASS, so some companies decide to assume a higher percentage of contributions in order to partially release their workers.

=== Self-employed worker contributions ===
Self-employed workers also have to contribute to the CASS. There is a minimum contribution base for a self-employed person within the average Andorran salary of all workers affiliated with social security in the past year as established by law. And then, over that minimum contribution base is applied the rate of 22%. Usually this minimum contribution is about €450 monthly (Average salary is used to be around €2000–€21000 per month).Of this total amount 10% is for the general branch and 12% for retirement.

== Health expenses reimbursed ==
In Andorra, healthcare works by co-payment: the social security administration (the CASS) covers a part of the total expenses. The costs, in addition, in most cases are borne first by the user, and then the CASS reimburses the subsidized amount by transfer or other similar method. The medical expenses covered by CASS are basically divided according to the medical service and the amount subsidized:

- Those patients who go to outpatients or health centers, to inquiries or visit specialists, CASS covers at least the 75% of the cost.
- In case of hospitalization CASS covers 90% of expenses, also allowing payment of only the percentage not covered by CASS.
- Expenses caused by occupational accidents or occupational diseases and births are 100% covered.
- Finally, if your health expenses in Andorra are with services not affiliated with Andorran social security, reimbursements can be up to 20% of the total.

CASS finances 100% of the treatment costs of people who demonstrate that they cannot cope with the debt, such as people without resources or in a situation of social exclusion. There are also agreements with France, Portugal and Spain for treatments that Andorra's medical centers can't provide and coverage extends to those countries.

== Referral Doctor ==
In September 2018 the service moved to a referral system, where patients must register with a general practitioner who would decide whether to refer them to a specialist. Those who follow this integrated route are encouraged by a higher rate of reimbursement and the purpose is to improve access, efficiency and coordination of medical care.

The user registered in the CASS currently must choose a doctor or pediatrician as referring doctor. This offers more personalized but general health care, and monitors the users' health status over time. It is the primary diagnosis, that autorises visits to specialists and guides the health system and coordinates with the different health professionals who treat the patient. In addition, it is not necessary to pay the total cost in consultations with the Referring Doctor.
