= Bondia (newspaper) =

Catalan newspaper

- Type: Daily newspaper
- Founded: 2004
- Language: Catalan
- Headquarters: Andorra la Vella
- Country: Andorra
- Website: www.bondia.ad (in Catalan)

Bondia (Catalan pronunciation: [ˌbɔnˈdi.ə]) is a newspaper published in Catalan. It is published in two editions:

- Principality of Andorra
- Lleida, Catalonia, Spain

The publisher is Group Bondia. It launched the newspaper in a free Andorran edition in Catalan in 2004. In 2006 it started publishing another edition in Lleida with a run of 15,000.
