= Encamp =

Parish in eastern Andorra

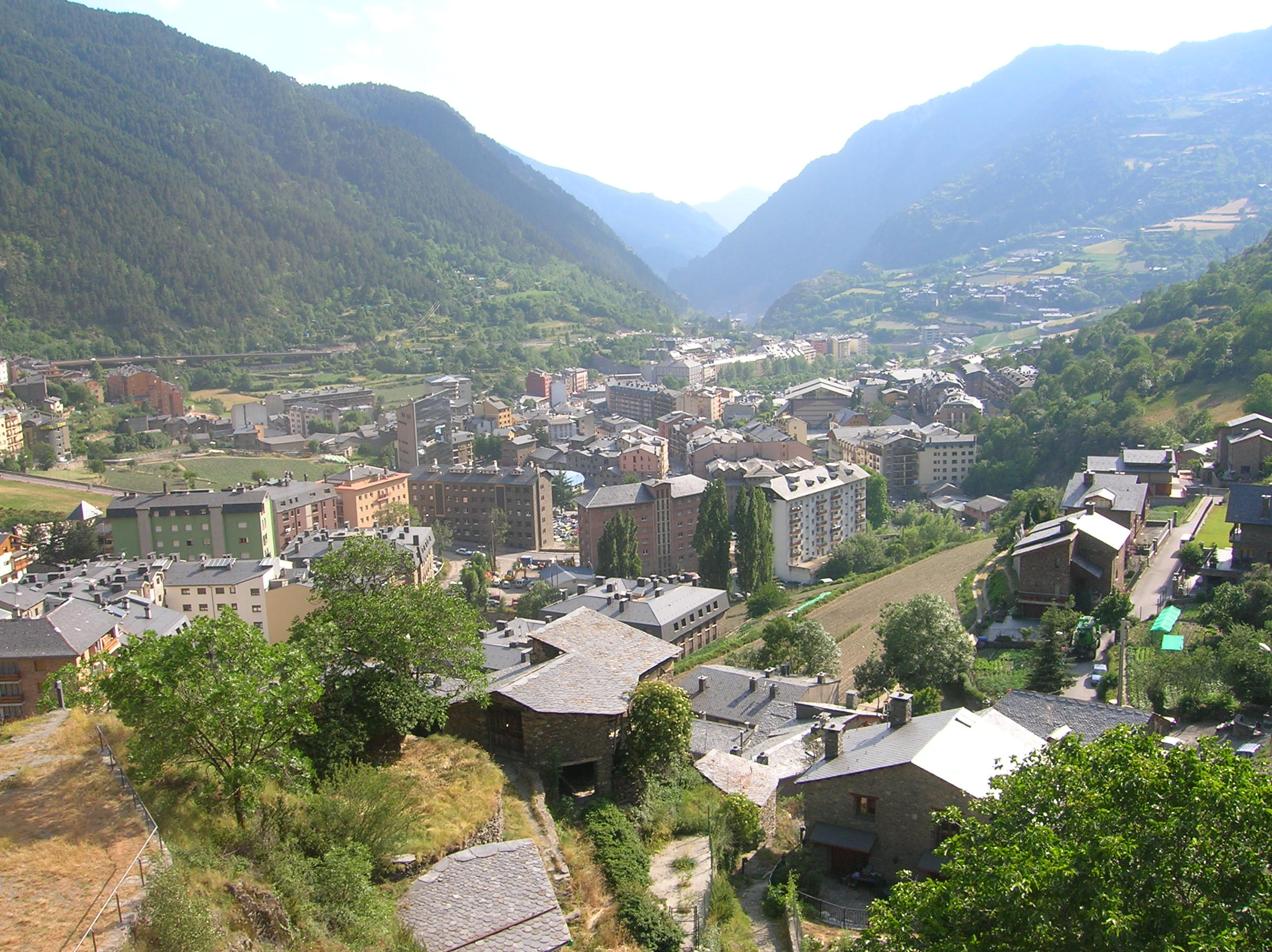
- The town of Encamp and the Valira d'Orient river valley

- Flag Coat of arms

- Location of Encamp town within Andorra
- Coordinates (Encamp town): 42°32′10″N 1°34′58″E
- Country: Andorra
- Parishes: Encamp
- Villages: Grau Roig, La Mosquera, El Tremat, Les Bons, Pas de la Casa, Vila

Government
  - Mayor: Miquel Alís Font (PS)

Area
  - Total: 74 km^{2} (29 sq mi)
- Elevation: 1,238 m (4,062 ft)

Population (2011)
  - Total: 13,521
  - Density: 180/km^{2} (470/sq mi)
- Demonyms: encampadà, encampadana
- Postal code: AD200
- Website: Official site

Encamp (Catalan pronunciation: [aŋˈkam]) is one of the parishes of Andorra, located on the Valira d'Orient river. It is also the name of the main town in the parish. Other settlements include Vila, El Pas de la Casa, El Tremat, La Mosquera and Les Bons. As of 2004, it has about 11,800 inhabitants. The centre of the municipality lies 1,226 metres (4,020 ft) above sea level. The highest mountain in the parish is Pic dels Pessons (2,865 m or 9,400 ft). It borders France and Spain.

== Geography ==
The parish contains the lake and dam of Estany de l'Illa in the Gargantillar hills at an altitude of about 2,500 metres (8,200 ft).

=== Climate ===
Encamp has an oceanic climate (Köppen climate classification Cfb). The average annual temperature in Encamp is 9.8 °C (49.6 °F). The average annual rainfall is 805.4 mm (31.71 in) with May as the wettest month. The temperatures are highest on average in July, at around 18.9 °C (66.0 °F), and lowest in January, at around 2.1 °C (35.8 °F). The highest temperature ever recorded in Encamp was 36.0 °C (96.8 °F) on 29 June 1935; the coldest temperature ever recorded was −16.0 °C (3.2 °F) on 2 February 1956.

Climate data for Encamp (1981–2010 averages, extremes 1934−2017)
Month	Jan	Feb	Mar	Apr	May	Jun	Jul	Aug	Sep	Oct	Nov	Dec	Year
Record high °C (°F)	18.0 (64.4)	20.0 (68.0)	24.0 (75.2)	29.0 (84.2)	30.0 (86.0)	36.0 (96.8)	35.0 (95.0)	35.0 (95.0)	32.0 (89.6)	28.0 (82.4)	20.0 (68.0)	21.0 (69.8)	36.0 (96.8)
Mean daily maximum °C (°F)	6.1 (43.0)	8.0 (46.4)	11.6 (52.9)	13.3 (55.9)	17.4 (63.3)	22.2 (72.0)	26.0 (78.8)	25.2 (77.4)	20.8 (69.4)	15.5 (59.9)	9.7 (49.5)	6.5 (43.7)	15.2 (59.4)
Daily mean °C (°F)	2.1 (35.8)	3.2 (37.8)	6.1 (43.0)	7.9 (46.2)	11.6 (52.9)	15.9 (60.6)	18.9 (66.0)	18.4 (65.1)	14.7 (58.5)	10.4 (50.7)	5.4 (41.7)	2.8 (37.0)	9.8 (49.6)
Mean daily minimum °C (°F)	−1.8 (28.8)	−1.6 (29.1)	0.6 (33.1)	2.4 (36.3)	5.9 (42.6)	9.5 (49.1)	11.8 (53.2)	11.6 (52.9)	8.7 (47.7)	5.3 (41.5)	1.1 (34.0)	−1.0 (30.2)	4.4 (39.9)
Record low °C (°F)	−15.0 (5.0)	−16.0 (3.2)	−11.0 (12.2)	−7.0 (19.4)	−2.0 (28.4)	0.0 (32.0)	3.0 (37.4)	3.0 (37.4)	0.0 (32.0)	−6.0 (21.2)	−8.0 (17.6)	−13.0 (8.6)	−16.0 (3.2)
Average precipitation mm (inches)	49.4 (1.94)	27.6 (1.09)	39.7 (1.56)	73.6 (2.90)	91.3 (3.59)	85.1 (3.35)	59.9 (2.36)	78.8 (3.10)	81.8 (3.22)	80.2 (3.16)	76.8 (3.02)	61.2 (2.41)	805.4 (31.71)
Average precipitation days (≥ 1.0 mm)	6.1	4.9	5.8	9.4	11.0	8.7	6.5	7.1	6.8	7.6	6.6	6.0	86.5
Source: Météo France

== Radio transmitter ==
Radio Andorra operated a transmitter at Lake Engolasters in Encamp from 7 August 1939 until 9 April 1981. The antenna still exists at an elevation of 1,600 metres (5,200 ft) (coordinates: 42°31′18″N 1°34′10″E).

== Economy ==
The economy of the parish is mostly based on its tourism industry, particularly skiing and hiking. There is also retail industry in the town of Encamp. There is a hydroelectric power station.

== Transport ==
A road tunnel is being built between Encamp and Anyós in the neighbouring parish of La Massana; It cut journey times from 10 to 15 minutes to 5 minutes.

A cable car used to connect the town with Lake Engolasters, but it has been dismantled. However, a 2-stretch funitel built in 1998 connects Encamp with a ridge at 2.500 m within Grandvalira ski resort, thus assuring a lift+ski link with El Pas de la Casa and the rest of the domain.

== Education ==
The following education establishments are located in Encamp:

- The Spanish international primary school Escuela Española de la Vall d'Orient.
- The Escola Andorrana de Maternal i 1a ensenyança d’Encamp (or Andorran Preschool and Elementary School of Encamp)
- The French Public Primary School of Encamp.
- The Andorran School of Pas de la Casa, Encamp.
- The French School of Pas de la Casa, Encamp, founded in the 1960's, at an altitude of over 2000 meters above sea level.

An Encamp secondary school was one of the places visited in 2018 by members of the Council of Europe's Education Department, with Andorran education minister Èric Jover, to review how the Andorran education system applied the council's Model of Competences for Democratic Culture (CDC).

== Notable people ==
- Josep Carles Laínez (born 1970 in Valencia) is a Spanish writer, has a home in Encamp
- Verònica Canals i Riba, Minister of Tourism
- Angelina Mas Joaniquet, suffragist and businesswoman
