= List of cities and towns in Andorra =

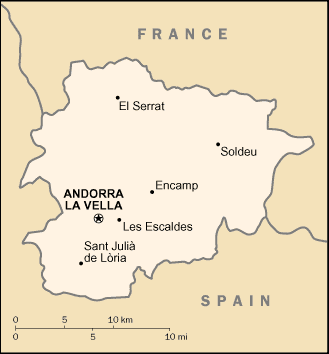
Map of Andorra

This is a list of cities, towns and villages in Andorra. The country is divided into 7 parishes with a total of 44 official statistical poblacions (i.e.: towns and villages) and other 9 non-statistical villages.

== List ==
Andorra la Vella, Capital of Andorra

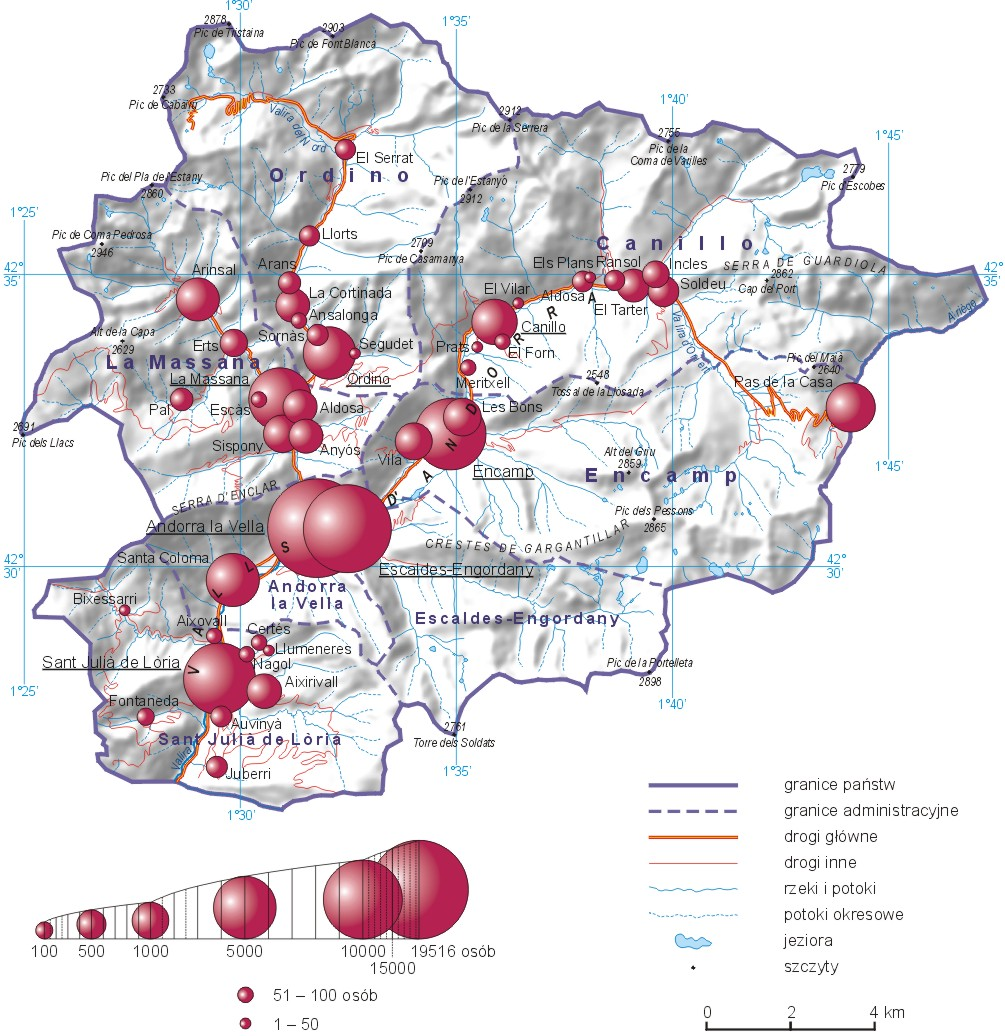
Population of Andorra by settlement in 2013

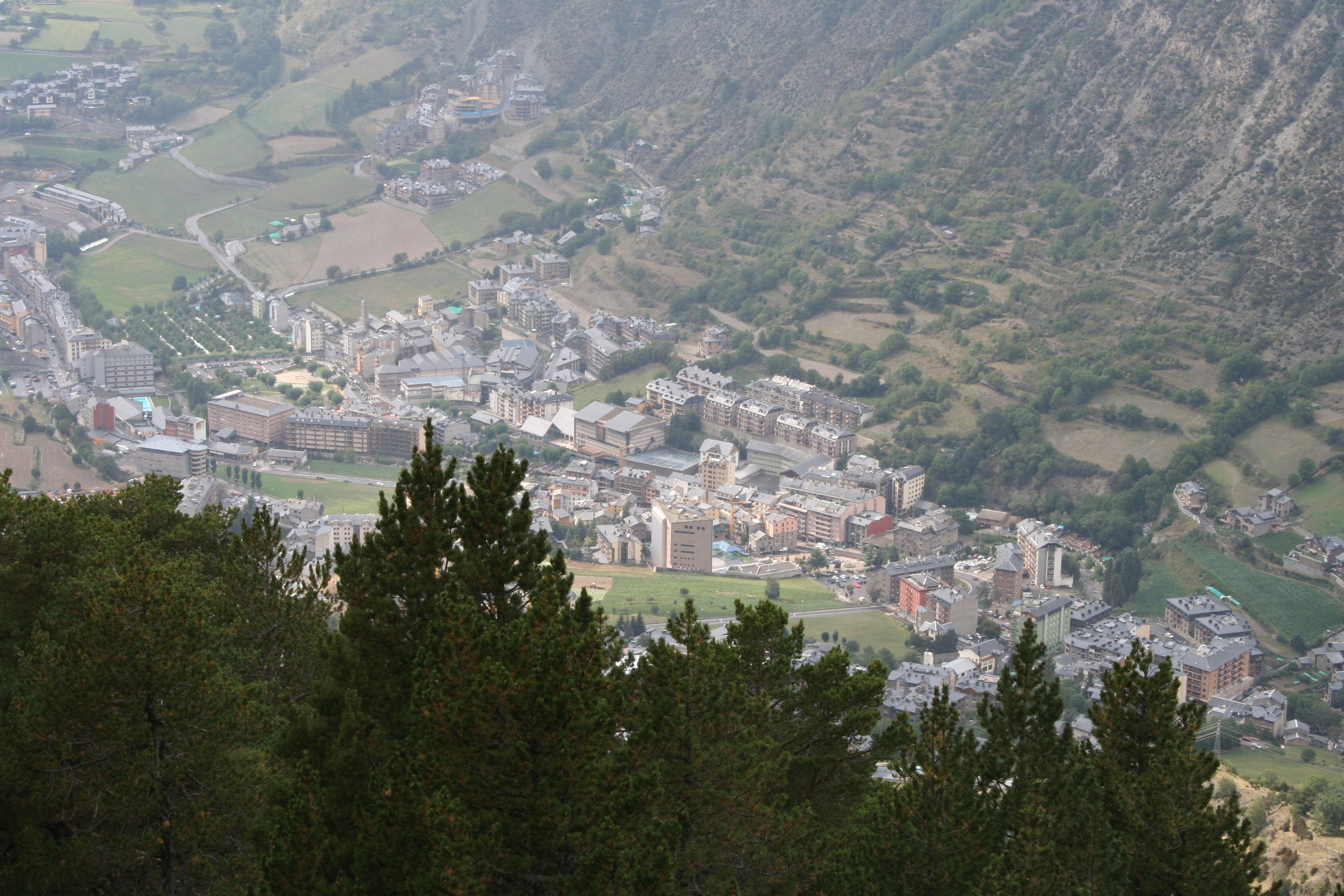
Encamp

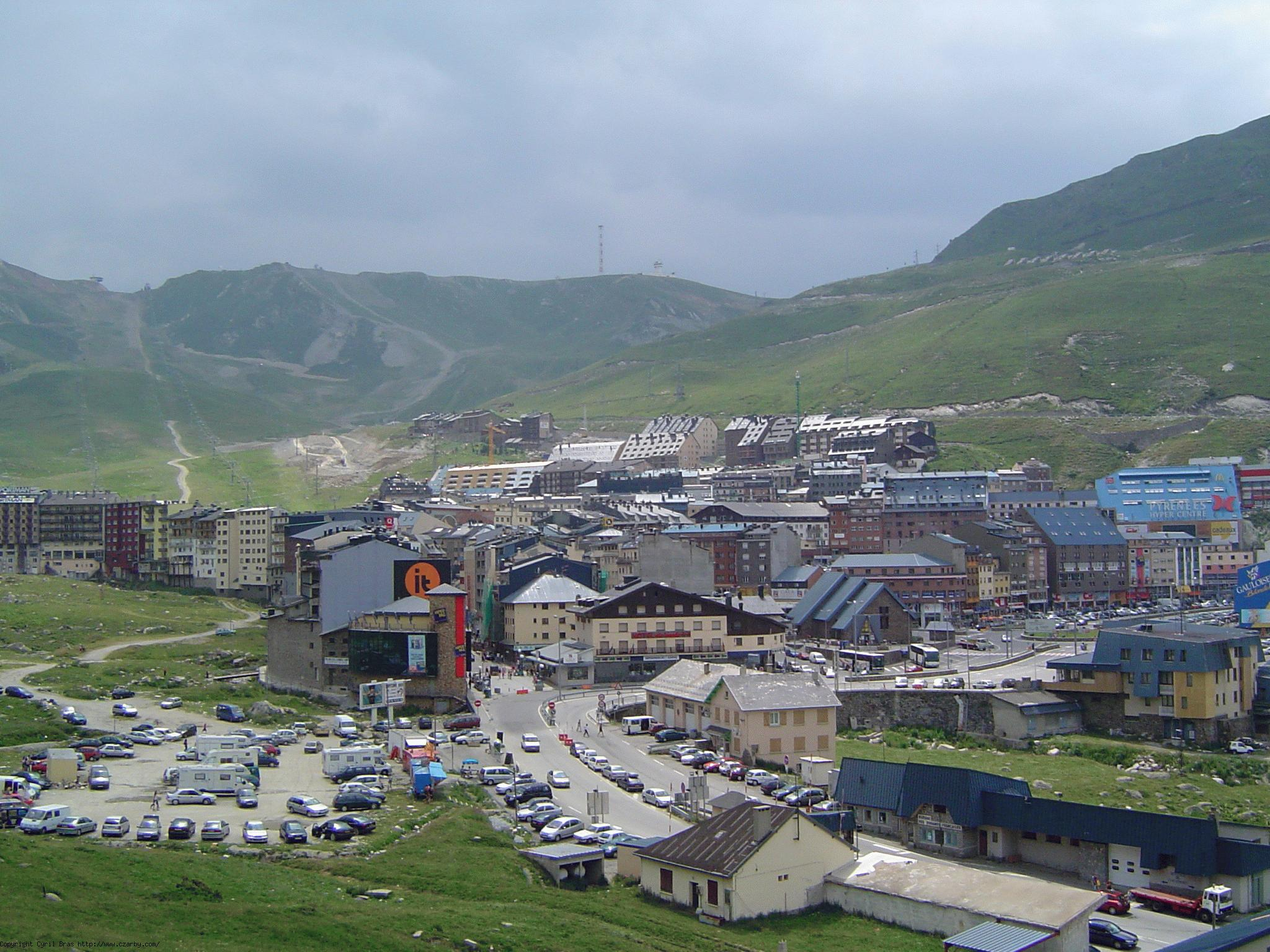
Pas de la Casa

| Parish | Populated place | Population (2023) | Parish population (2023) |
|---|---|---|---|
| Canillo | Canillo | 2,550 | 5,781 |
| Canillo | L'Aldosa | 289 | 5,781 |
| Canillo | El Forn | 99 | 5,781 |
| Canillo | Incles | 510 | 5,781 |
| Canillo | Meritxell | 69 | 5,781 |
| Canillo | Els Plans | 38 | 5,781 |
| Canillo | Prats | 82 | 5,781 |
| Canillo | Ransol | 344 | 5,781 |
| Canillo | Soldeu | 790 | 5,781 |
| Canillo | El Tarter | 1,003 | 5,781 |
| Canillo | El Vilar | 7 | 5,781 |
| Encamp | Encamp | 8,326 | 12,826 |
| Encamp | Les Bons | 1,156 | 12,826 |
| Encamp | Pas de la Casa | 2,156 | 12,826 |
| Encamp | Vila | 1,188 | 12,826 |
| Encamp | El Tremat | n/a | 12,826 |
| Ordino | Ordino | 3,217 | 5,440 |
| Ordino | Ansalonga | 50 | 5,440 |
| Ordino | Arans | 234 | 5,440 |
| Ordino | La Cortinada | 948 | 5,440 |
| Ordino | Llorts | 280 | 5,440 |
| Ordino | Segudet | 60 | 5,440 |
| Ordino | El Serrat | 312 | 5,440 |
| Ordino | Sornàs | 339 | 5,440 |
| La Massana | La Massana | 5,979 | 11,591 |
| La Massana | L'Aldosa | 811 | 11,591 |
| La Massana | Anyós | 1,006 | 11,591 |
| La Massana | Arinsal | 2,127 | 11,591 |
| La Massana | Erts | 574 | 11,591 |
| La Massana | Escàs | 13 | 11,591 |
| La Massana | Pal | 248 | 11,591 |
| La Massana | Sispony | 833 | 11,591 |
| La Massana | Puiol del Piu | n/a | 11,591 |
| La Massana | Xixerella | n/a | 11,591 |
| Andorra la Vella | Andorra la Vella (capital) | 20,719 | 24,042 |
| Andorra la Vella | Santa Coloma | 3,323 | 24,042 |
| Andorra la Vella | La Margineda | 3,323 | 24,042 |
| Sant Julià de Lòria | Sant Julià de Lòria | 7,962 | 9,915 |
| Sant Julià de Lòria | Aixirivall | 1,041 | 9,915 |
| Sant Julià de Lòria | Aixovall | 80 | 9,915 |
| Sant Julià de Lòria | Auvinyà | 218 | 9,915 |
| Sant Julià de Lòria | Bixessarri | 61 | 9,915 |
| Sant Julià de Lòria | Certers | 85 | 9,915 |
| Sant Julià de Lòria | Fontaneda | 119 | 9,915 |
| Sant Julià de Lòria | Juberri | 170 | 9,915 |
| Sant Julià de Lòria | Llumeneres | 4 | 9,915 |
| Sant Julià de Lòria | Nagol | 175 | 9,915 |
| Escaldes-Engordany (Note: Les Escaldes and Engordany are former villages and nowadays the parish of Escaldes-Engordany is only one city.) | Escaldes | 15,506 | 15,506 |
| Escaldes-Engordany | Engolasters | n/a | 15,506 |
| Escaldes-Engordany | Engordany | n/a | 15,506 |
| Escaldes-Engordany | Entremesaigües | n/a | 15,506 |
| Escaldes-Engordany | Ràmio | n/a | 15,506 |
| Escaldes-Engordany | Els Vilars | n/a | 15,506 |

== Largest towns ==
| Ranking | Name | Population (2023) |
|---|---|---|
| 1 | Andorra la Vella | 20,719 |
| 2 | Escaldes-Engordany | 15,506 |
| 3 | Encamp | 8,326 |
| 4 | Sant Julià de Lòria | 7,962 |
| 5 | La Massana | 5,979 |
| 6 | Santa Coloma | 3,323 |
| 7 | Ordino | 3,217 |
| 8 | Canillo | 2,550 |
| 9 | El Pas de la Casa | 2,156 |
| 10 | Arinsal | 2,127 |
