= Els Plans =

Village in Canillo, Andorra

- Location in Andorra
- Coordinates: 42°34′51.6″N 1°37′58.69″E
- Country: Andorra
- Parish: Canillo

Population (2009)
  - Total: 54

Els Plans (Catalan pronunciation: [els ˈplans]) is a village in Andorra, located in the parish of Canillo. It is one of the 44 official poblacions of Andorra and, as of 2009, its population was of 54.

== Geography ==
The village is located on a mountain road near Ransol and L'Aldosa de Canillo, above the National Road CG-2.
