= Església de Sant Miquel de Prats =

Church in Prats, Andorra

Coordinates: 42.5604°N 1.5939°E

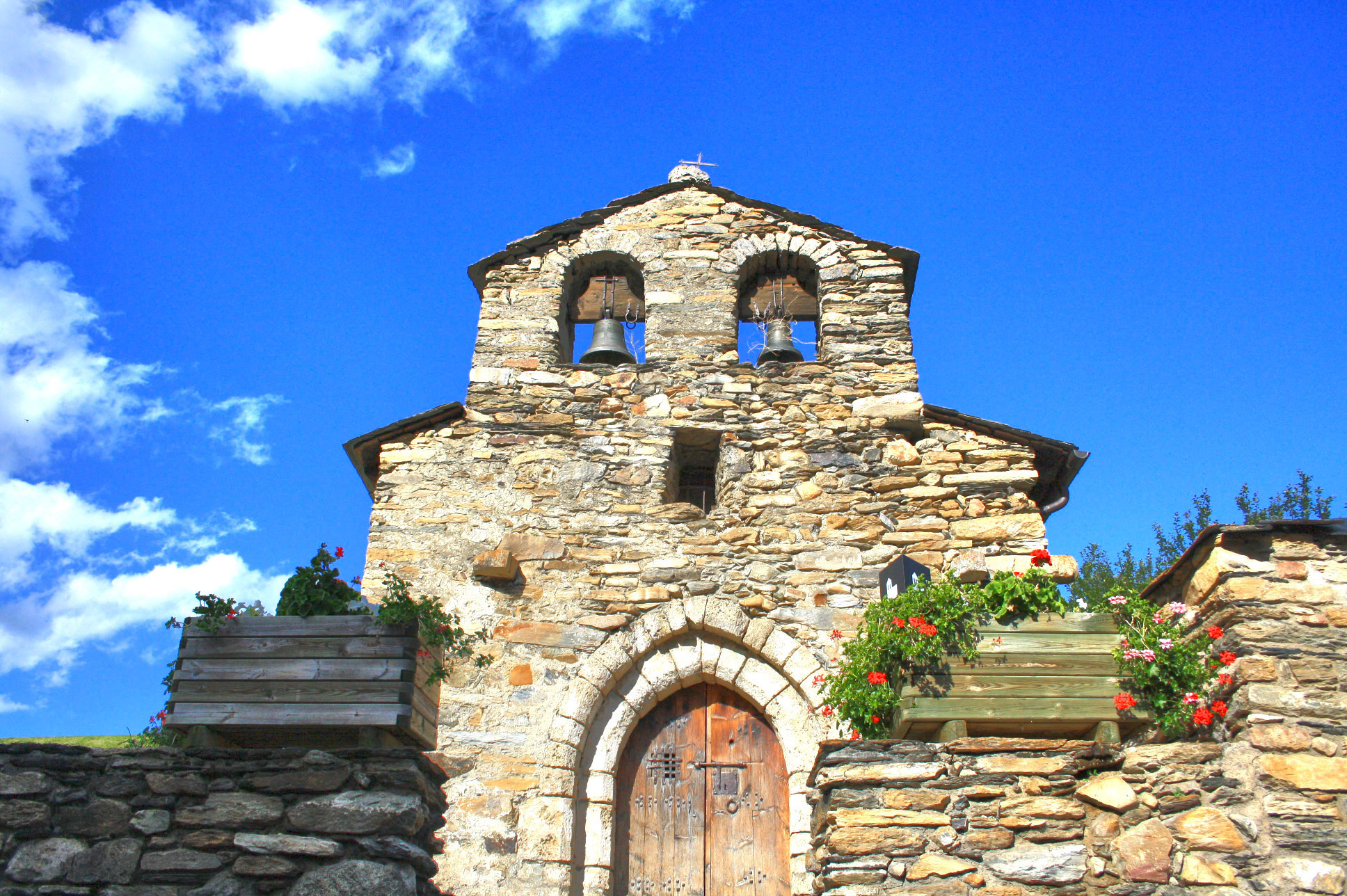
Església de Sant Miquel de Prats

Església de Sant Miquel de Prats is a church located in Prats, Canillo Parish, Andorra. It is a heritage property registered in the Cultural Heritage of Andorra. It was built in the 12th-13th century.
