= L'Aldosa =

L'Aldosa is the name of two localities in Andorra:

- L'Aldosa de Canillo, in the parish of Canillo
- L'Aldosa de la Massana, in the parish of La Massana
