= Soldeu =

Village in Canillo, Andorra

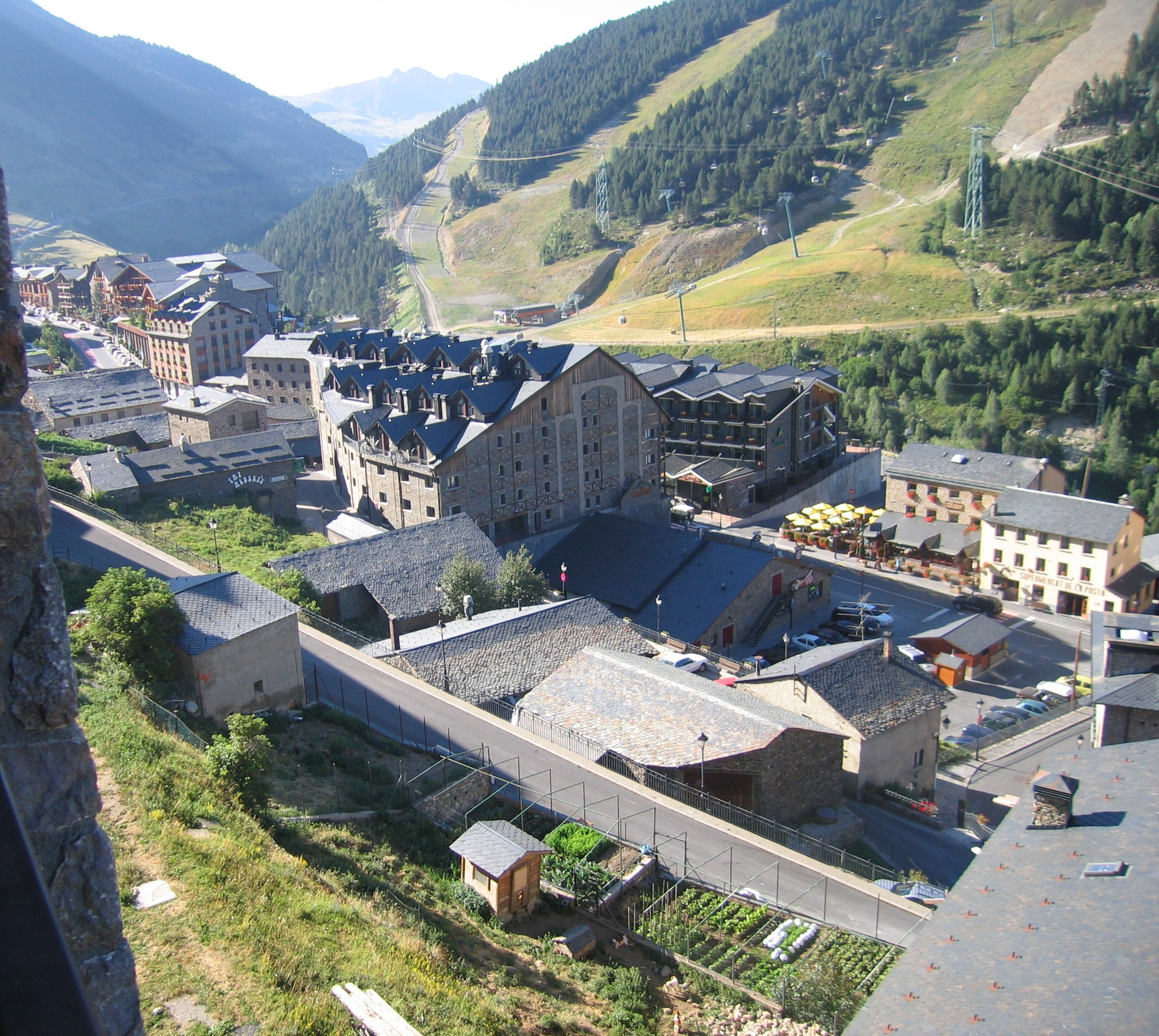
- Soldeu in July 2010

- Location in Andorra Soldeu (Europe)
- Coordinates: 42°34′37″N 1°40′2″E
- Country: Andorra
- Parish: Canillo
- Elevation: 1,710 m (5,610 ft)

Population (2012)
  - Total: 1,109

Soldeu (Catalan pronunciation: [solˈdew]) is a village and ski resort in Andorra in the Pyrenees mountains, located in the parish of Canillo.

== Overview ==
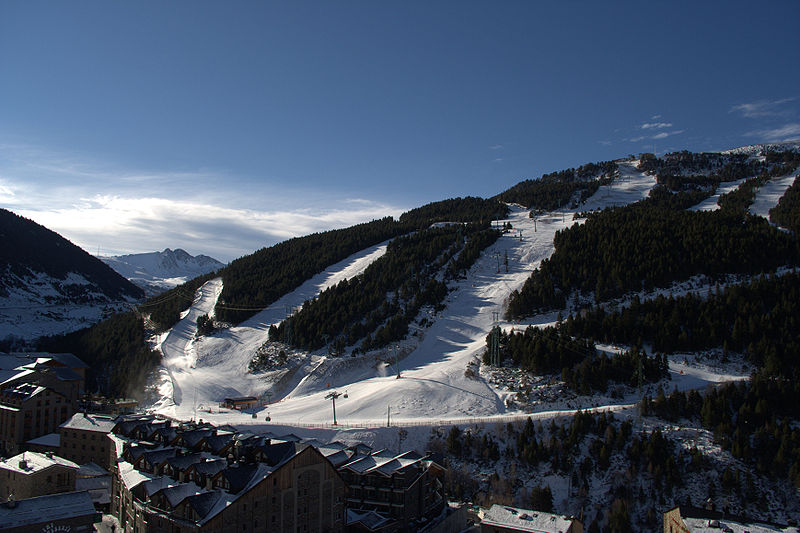
The town and ski resort base in March 2007.

It comes alive in the winter months as a ski town, and is part of the Grand Valira ski resort, the largest in the Pyrenees with 205 km (127 mi) of ski runs. According to The Sunday Times, Soldeu is one of the three best budget skiing resorts in Europe. The ski area links to Encamp, Canillo, El Tarter, Grau Roig and Pas de la Casa. The Soldeu Ski School has a large number of native English speaking instructors and has won awards for the quality of its tuition.

The village is at an elevation of 1,710 metres (5,610 ft) above sea level and the top of the ski area is at 2,580 m (8,465 ft). The gondola from the village rises to 2,250 m (7,380 ft), where the ski and board schools as well as restaurants are located. From there, it is possible to ski to the top of the El Tarter gondola or the village of El Tarter itself via the blue-rated 'gall de bosc' run.

The village has various hotels, bars, restaurants, as well as ski and snowboard shops. It is more family orientated than neighbouring Pas de la Casa. The native language is Catalan. Soldeu is popular with British and Irish tourists, and English is spoken in many shops and restaurants.

== World Cup racing ==
Soldeu hosted World Cup alpine events for the first time in February 2012. Three women's races were scheduled, two giant slaloms and a slalom. The additional GS was due to a cancellation at Courchevel in mid-December, but was also cancelled at Soldeu due to extremely high winds on Friday. Women's races were hosted again in 2016: a super-G and a combined in late February.

The World Cup finals (nine events) of 2019 were held Soldeu in mid-March, with speed events on the Àliga downhill course and technical events on the Avet course. There is also a possibility to host Alpine skiing at the Winter Olympics with other events in nearby European countries in 2030 or later.
