= Climent =

Climent is a surname. Notable people with the surname include:

- Carmen Climent (born 1996), Basque film, theatre and television actress, singer, and dancer
- Gema Climent (born 1971), Spanish psychologist and technology entrepreneur in the field of clinical neuropsychology
- Ramón Climent (born 1963), Chilean football manager and former player
- Carles Fages de Climent (1902–1968), Catalan writer, poet, and journalist
- Fernando Climent (born 1958), Spanish rower and Olympic medalist
- Joaquín Climent (born 1958), Spanish actor
- Josep Climent i Avinent (1706–1781), Spanish bishop of Barcelona
- Mariam Ramón Climent (born 1976), Spanish female tennis player
- Mario Climent (born 2002), Spanish footballer
- Tito Climent (1917–1988), Argentine singer and film actor

== See also ==
- Climent Palmitjavila (1940–2021), Andorran politician
