= El Vilar =

Hamlet in Canillo, Andorra

- Location in Andorra
- Coordinates: 42°34′N 1°36′E
- Country: Andorra
- Parish: Canillo
- Elevation: 1,968 m (6,457 ft)

Population (2022)
  - Total: 9

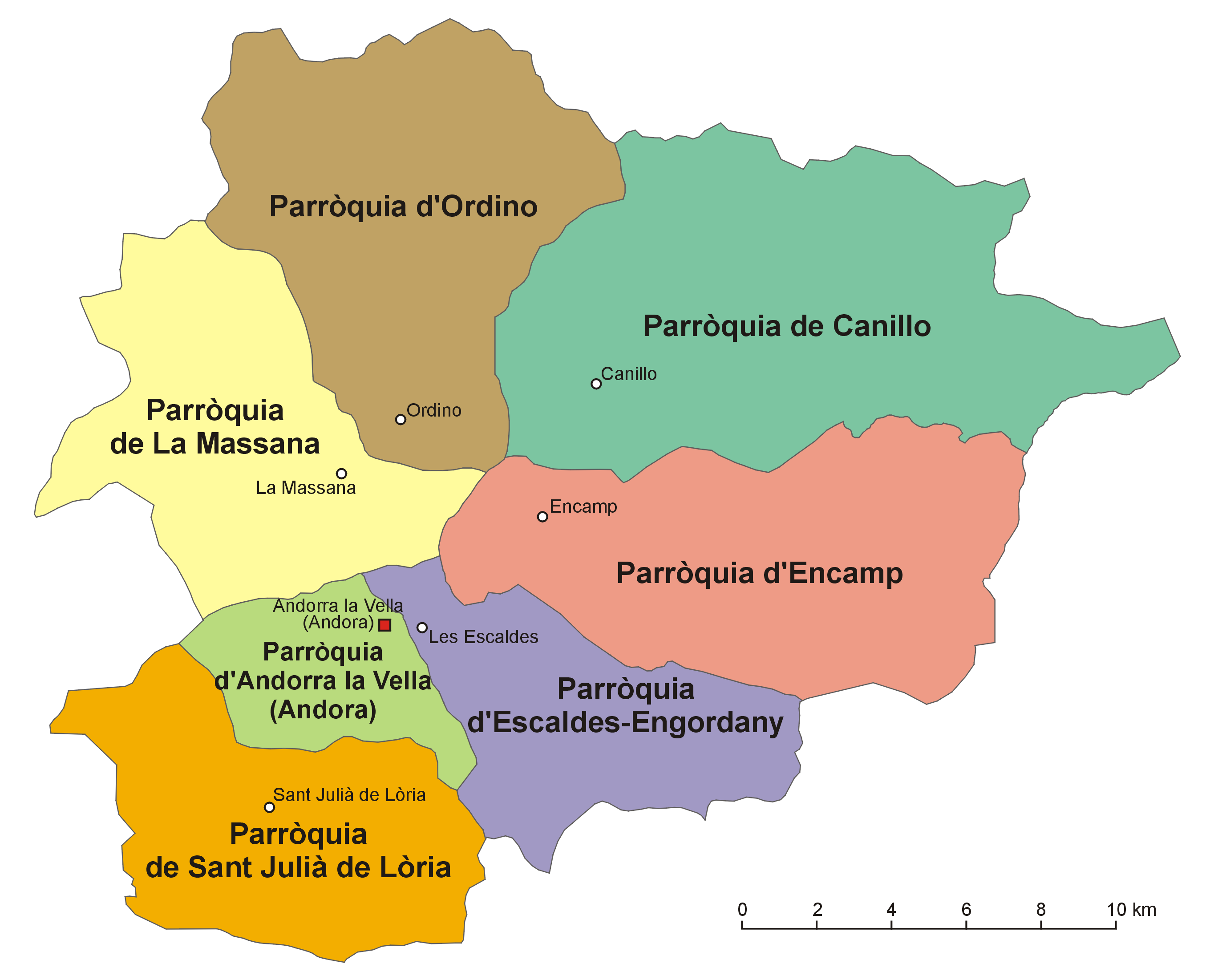
Administrative divisions of Andorra. The parish of Canillo is in the north-east.

El Vilar (Catalan pronunciation: [el βiˈla]) is a hamlet in Andorra, located in the parish of Canillo.
