= Sant Joan de Caselles =

Church in Canillo, Andorra

Coordinates: 42°34′15″N 1°36′28″E

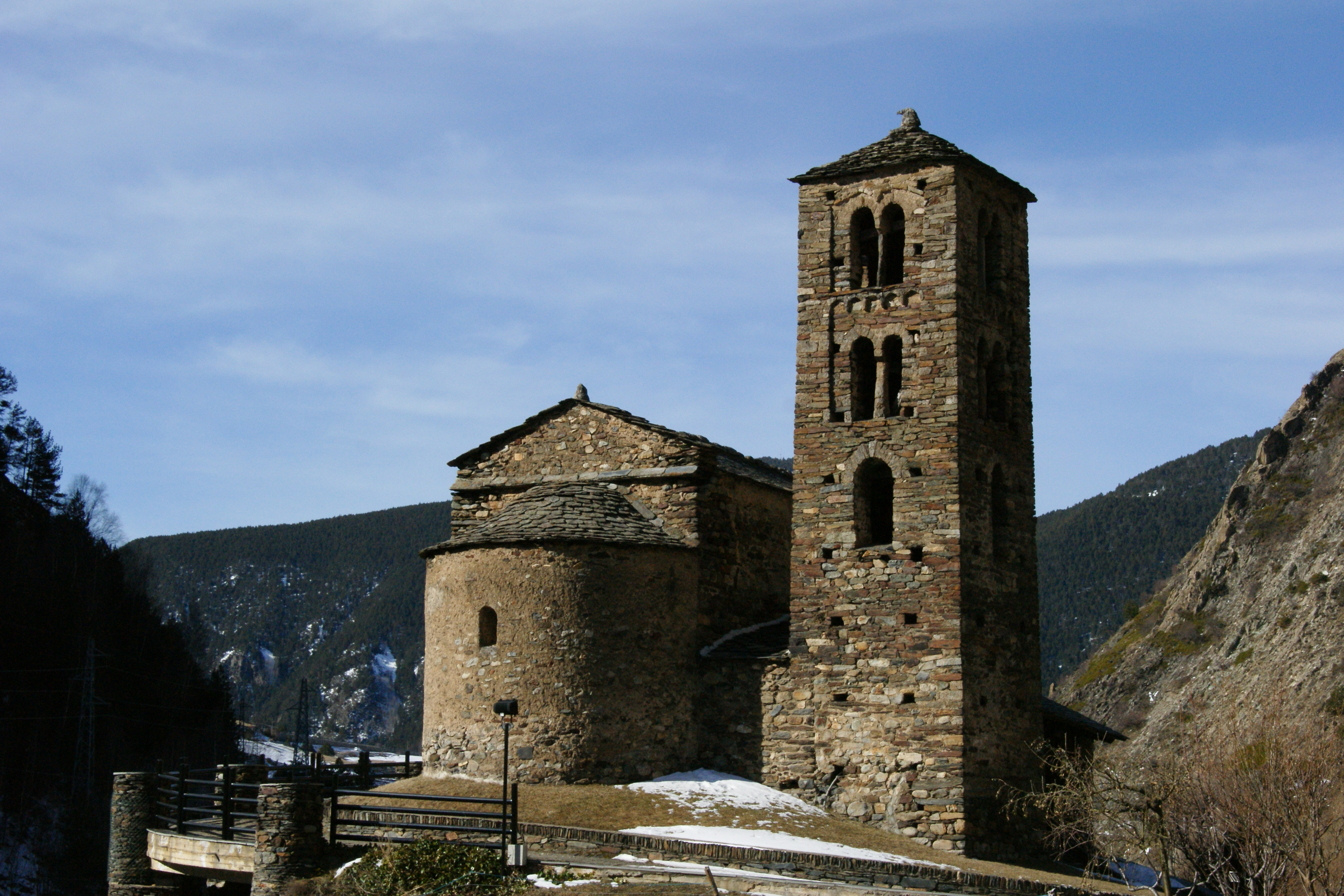
Església de Sant Joan de Caselles

Església de Sant Joan de Caselles is a church located in Canillo, Andorra. It is a heritage property registered in the Cultural Heritage of Andorra, and was built in the 11–12th century. The 16th century altarpiece depicting scenes from the life and martyrdom of Saint John the apostle is considered of exceptional quality.

== Building ==
The church is situated on a rock overlooking the road connecting Canillo to France. It was constructed in the 11th–12th century, and has a typical Romanesque layout. The nave is rectangular, there is a wooden roof and a semi-circular apse. The square bell tower is in the Lombardy style. The two simple porches were probably added in the 16th and 17th centuries. There is a Baroque wooden choir. The church was restored between 1934 and 1935 by architect Cèsar Martinell, affecting the roof of the apse, the bell tower and main facade porch. In 1962 and 1963 further restoration was carried out to the altarpiece, the nave, and the stucco Christ.

== Art ==
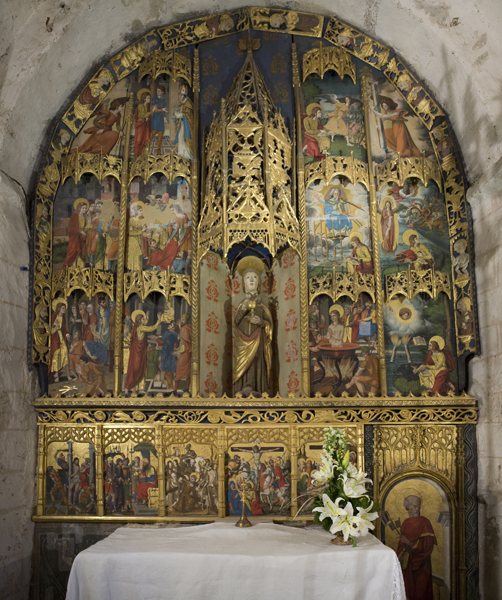
Retable

Inside the building different artistic pieces are preserved, the main one being a large stucco image of Christ in Majesty, as well as a mural with frescoes depicting scenes from Calvary with Saint Longinus and Stephaton, accompanied by the half-hidden Sun and Moon, works from the 12th century.

There is also a retable dating from the 1575, which is considered of exceptional quality. and attributed to the Master of Canillo. Influenced by the Italian and Germanic Renaissance style, it depicts scenes from the life and martyrdom of Saint John the apostle, author of the book of revelation and patron saint of the church, in particular his visions in Patmos.
