= Magda Marquet =

Andorran biotechnologist and businesswoman (born 1958)

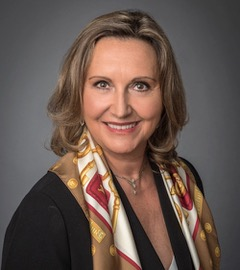
- Marquet in 2020
- Born: 1958 (age 67–68); Canillo, Andorra
- Education: Institut national des sciences appliquées de Toulouse
- Occupations: Biotechnologist, businesswoman
- Spouse: François Ferré

Magda Marquet Mandicó (born 1958) is an Andorran biotechnologist and laboratory businesswoman. She has spent most of her professional career in San Diego, United States.

== Career ==
Marquet was born in 1958 in Canillo, Andorra. Her mother died when she was young. Marquet got a PhD in biochemistry from the Institut national des sciences appliquées de Toulouse (INSA), France. Shortly after completing her studies, she began working at a biotechnology company called Transgene in France.

She moved to California with her husband, François Ferré, also a scientist, where he went to do post-doctoral research at the University of California in the late 1980s.

The couple soon became recognised in San Diego for their pioneering work in the fields of plasmid DNA production and gene quantification. In 1998, they founded Althea Technologies, a company offering biotechnology services to the pharmaceutical industry, and Marquet was its co-CEO from 2000 to 2008. The company was acquired in 2013 by Ajinomoto Althea Inc. In 2008, they founded AltheaDX, dedicated to molecular diagnostics, and in 2013, Alma Life Sciences, an investment company which Marquet is its co-CEO.

Marquet has been an executive at other American companies in the sector, such as Vical Inc., Amylin Pharmaceuticals, Protein Polymer Technologies, Sente, Independa, Portable Genomics, MD Revolution, Arcturus Therapeutics Ltd and Syntro Corp; and has been involved with start-ups and financing scientific companies such as Traversa Therapeutics, Huya Bioscience, and Trius Therapeutics.

Marquet is also a member of non-profit organisations such as BIOCOM, San Diego Economic Development Corporation and the Kyoto Symposium Organization and the University of California, San Diego's Moores Cancer Centre and Biological Sciences Dean Leadership Council. In 2014 Marquet joined the Board of Advisors of the Life Sciences Foundation.

She has also been honorary consul of Andorra to California.

Her latest projects have been related to artificial intelligence, new cancer treatments, and the development of safer RNA vaccines against COVID-19 and influenza.

== Awards ==
- Ernst & Young Regional Entrepreneur of the Year Award in the Life Sciences category (2005)
- Athena Pinnacle Award
- Director of the Year Award (Corporate Directors Forum, 2016)
- First female inducted into the Connect Entrepreneur Hall of Fame (2016)
- Golden Medal (University of Andorra, 2024)

== Articles ==
- Marquet, Magda, and Institut national des sciences appliquées (Toulouse). Contribution a L’etude Des Mecanismes d’Excretion Du Glutamate Par Corynebacterium Glutamicum : Optimisation Des Conditions de Production. [s.n.], 1983.
- Marquet, Magda, et al. Plasmid Stability during Continuous Culture in aSaccharomyces Cerevisiae Double Mutant Transformed by a Plasmid Carrying a Eukaryotic Gene. Biotechnology Letters, 1986.
- Cappello, J., Crissman, J., Dorman, M., Mikolajczak, M., Textor, G., Marquet, M. and Ferrari, F. (1990), Genetic Engineering of Structural Protein Polymers. Biotechnol Progress, 6: 198-202.
- Horn, Nancy A., et al. Cancer Gene Therapy Using Plasmid DNA: Purification of DNA for Human Clinical Trials. no. 5, 1995, pp. 565–73.
