= Incles =

Hamlet in Canillo, Andorra

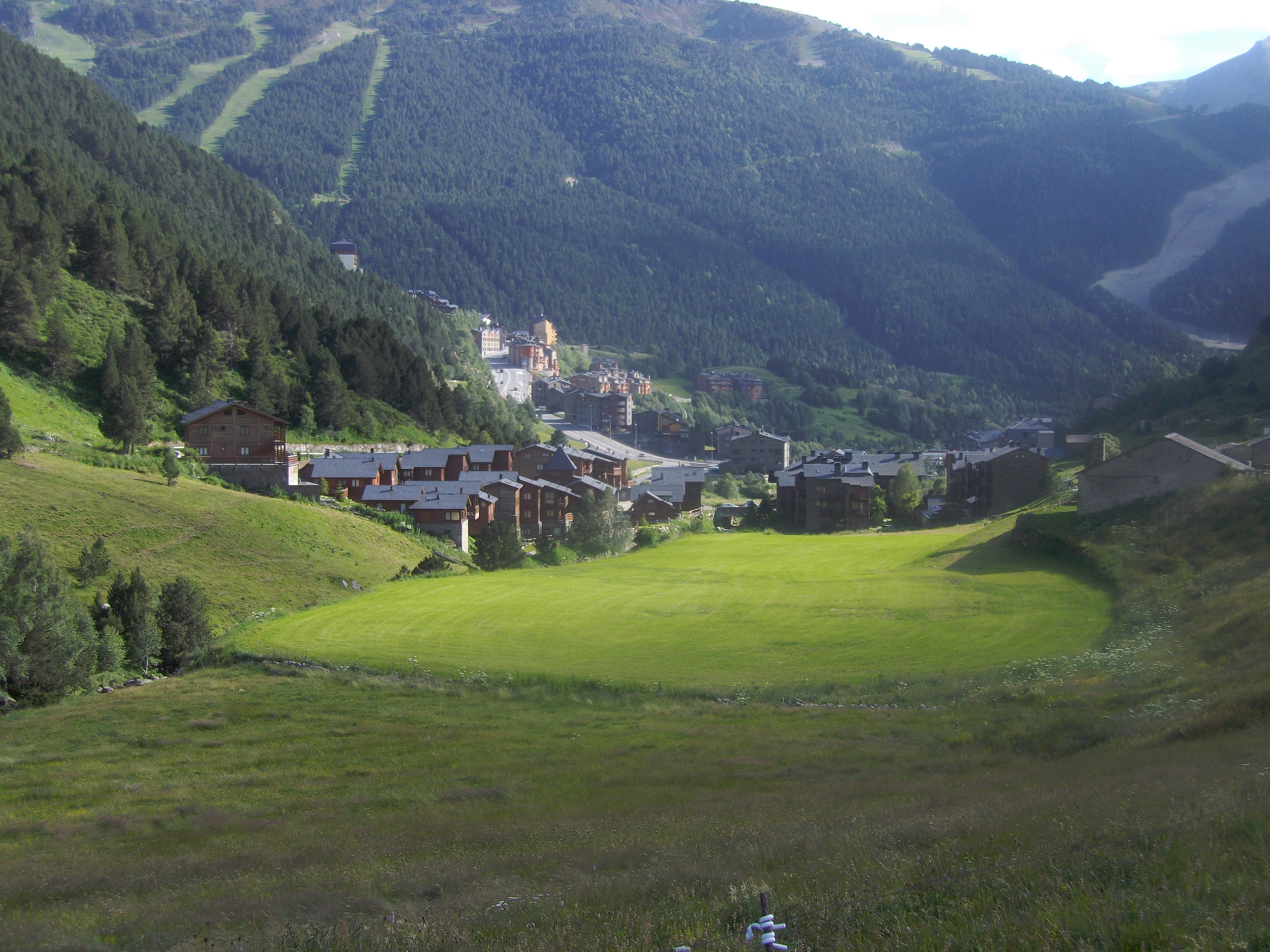
- View of Incles from the Incles valley

- Location in Andorra
- Coordinates: 42°34′59″N 1°39′43″E
- Country: Andorra
- Parish: Canillo

Area
  - Land: 7.8 km^{2} (3 sq mi)
- 2 km^{2} (0.77 sq mi)

Population (2005)
  - Total: 330

Incles (Catalan pronunciation: [ˈiŋkles]) is a hamlet and valley in Andorra, located in the parish of Canillo.
