= Miquel Naudí =

Andorran politician (1948–2026)

Miquel Naudí Clop (1948 – 11 January 2026) was an Andorran hotelier and politician.

== Life and career ==
Naudí was born in 1948 in Canillo, to Marcel and Rosa. In 1978/79, he served as a councilor in Canillo. On 10 December 1981, he was elected General Councilor for the region. From 2016 to 2019, he served as a communal counsellor, heading the agriculture commission.

Naudí died on 11 January 2026, at the age of 77.
