= El Forn =

Hamlet in Canillo, Andorra

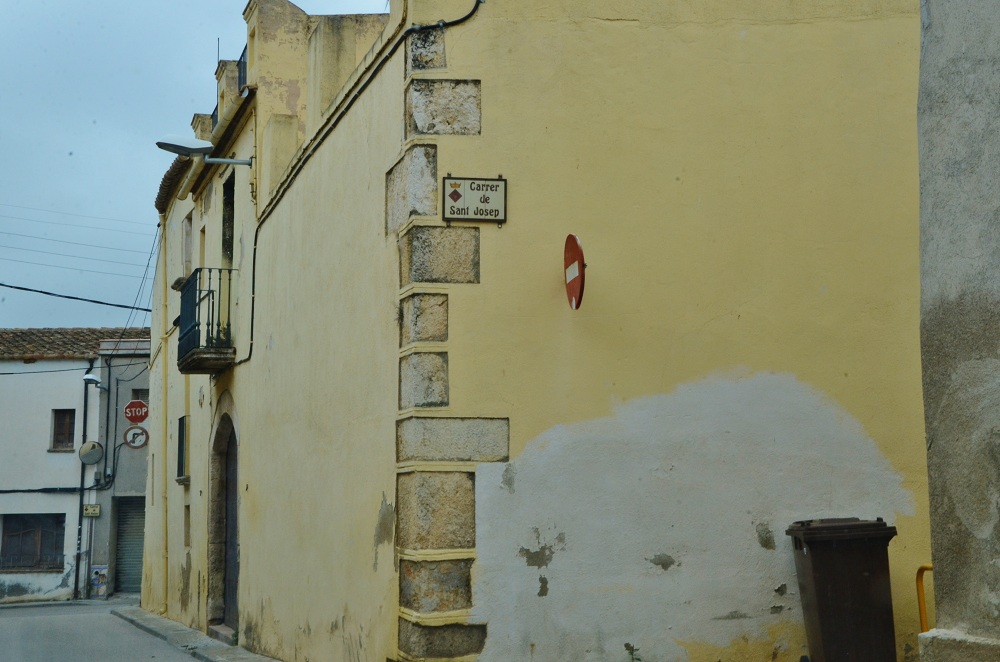

- Location in Andorra
- Coordinates: 42°32′N 1°34′E
- Country: Andorra
- Parish: Canillo

Population (2012)
  - Total: 102

El Forn (Catalan pronunciation: [el ˈfoɾn]), also known as El Forn de Canillo, is a hamlet in Andorra, located in the parish of Canillo. It is particularly significant as the site of the El Forn landslide, the largest active deep-seated landslide in the Pyrenees. This geological feature consists mainly of Silurian black shales within its shear band and has been extensively studied due to its slow but continuous movement, which causes visible damage to local infrastructure. The landslide's complex history spans at least 30,000 years and is closely linked to glacial activity in the Valira d'Orient valley, with three major sliding events identified through geological analysis and radiocarbon dating. Due to potential impacts on nearby villages, comprehensive monitoring systems including boreholes, inclinometers, and radar interferometry have been implemented to assess risks and develop early-warning strategies.

== Geology ==
Geological studies indicate that the El Forn landslide consists mainly of Silurian black shales within its shear band—a zone of weakened material along which movement occurs. This shear band has been intensively studied due to its significance in the landslide's ongoing slow movement, which has caused visible damage such as fractures and subsidence in roads and structures. Monitoring data from 2008 to 2018 identified three active regions within the landslide, with displacement rates reaching roughly 4 centimetres per year.

Research into the microstructural properties of the landslide's shear band reveals that the alignment and orientation of clay minerals (phyllosilicates) significantly contribute to the landslide's stability. In the centre of the shear band, phyllosilicates are closely aligned parallel to the direction of landslide movement, creating conditions that greatly reduce the material's strength and increase its plasticity. This alignment facilitates the landslide's slow, continuous movement by lowering the internal friction within the shear band, especially under saturated conditions. Fractures within this zone facilitate fluid movement, which can further destabilise the landslide, particularly during periods of increased rainfall or rising groundwater levels.

The geological context surrounding the landslide indicates a complex relationship between landslide dynamics and historical glacial activity. The structure of the slope has been influenced by glacial erosion, which deepened and reshaped the Valira d'Orient valley repeatedly during cold climatic phases, altering slope stability and promoting episodic landslide activity.

Due to its potential to impact infrastructure and local communities, the El Forn landslide has been extensively monitored through boreholes, inclinometers, and radar interferometry. These efforts aim to improve predictions of its movements and assess risks for early-warning strategies to protect the nearby villages, Canillo and Prats. Regular monitoring using inclinometers and groundwater piezometers has helped identify specific sectors such as Cal Ponet–Cal Borronet and Prats as particularly active and requiring closer surveillance. Within the Cal Ponet–Cal Borronet lobe, the primary continuous monitoring is conducted through a borehole (S10), equipped with instruments that measure displacement, groundwater pressure, and temperature every 20 minutes.

In addition to ground-based instrumentation, remote sensing techniques using interferometric synthetic-aperture radar (InSAR) satellites have significantly enhanced landslide monitoring efforts. These methods allow precise surface displacement measurements without direct access to difficult terrain. Analysis of satellite data from 2019 to 2021 demonstrated clear seasonal variation in landslide movement, with peak displacement typically observed between May and August during snow-free periods. Recent research has determined that optimal monitoring accuracy using remote sensing is achievable by employing approximately 20–25 well-distributed observation points across the landslide area.

== Chronology of landslide events ==
The El Forn landslide area has experienced a complex series of geological events closely connected to historical glacial activities in the region of the Valira d'Orient valley. Geological studies indicate that multiple episodes of instability were closely associated with the erosion and landscape modifications caused by glaciers during and after the last glacial period. Three main phases of landslides have been distinguished based on geological analysis, radiocarbon dating, and careful examination of sediments and landforms.

The first major landslide likely occurred more than 30,000 years ago, triggered by intense erosion at the base of the slope as glaciers retreated. This erosion removed supporting material from the slope, causing large sections composed mainly of weak, carbonaceous Silurian shale and slate to collapse. This initial event was substantial, involving rotational and translational sliding, meaning that large blocks of earth not only rotated downward but also shifted horizontally. The resulting debris from this episode may have temporarily blocked the Valira d'Orient valley.

A second significant landslide event has been identified from sediment layers deposited after approximately 21,300 years ago. This landslide took place during a colder climatic period, potentially coinciding with renewed glacial advances in the valley. Deposits from this second event partly overlay the older landslide materials and likely also formed a natural dam across the valley, creating a temporary lake. Radiocarbon dating of buried sediments beneath these deposits provided key evidence to establish the timeline for this phase of instability.

The third and more recent landslide is suggested to have occurred about 8,800 years ago, with debris originating from steep slopes near the cliffs known locally as Roca del Forn. This event, primarily rotational in character, reshaped the existing landslide deposits significantly. Geological investigations have mapped the resulting mass of displaced rock and soil, clearly delineating its extent. Ongoing geological monitoring since 2005 using instruments such as inclinometers, extensometers, and groundwater piezometers has demonstrated continuing minor movements, emphasising that the slope remains geologically active and potentially unstable.

Together, these findings have helped researchers understand the complex interplay between climatic fluctuations, glacial processes, and geological stability at El Forn, offering crucial insights for current and future landslide risk management efforts in the area.
