= El Tarter =

Village in Canillo, Andorra

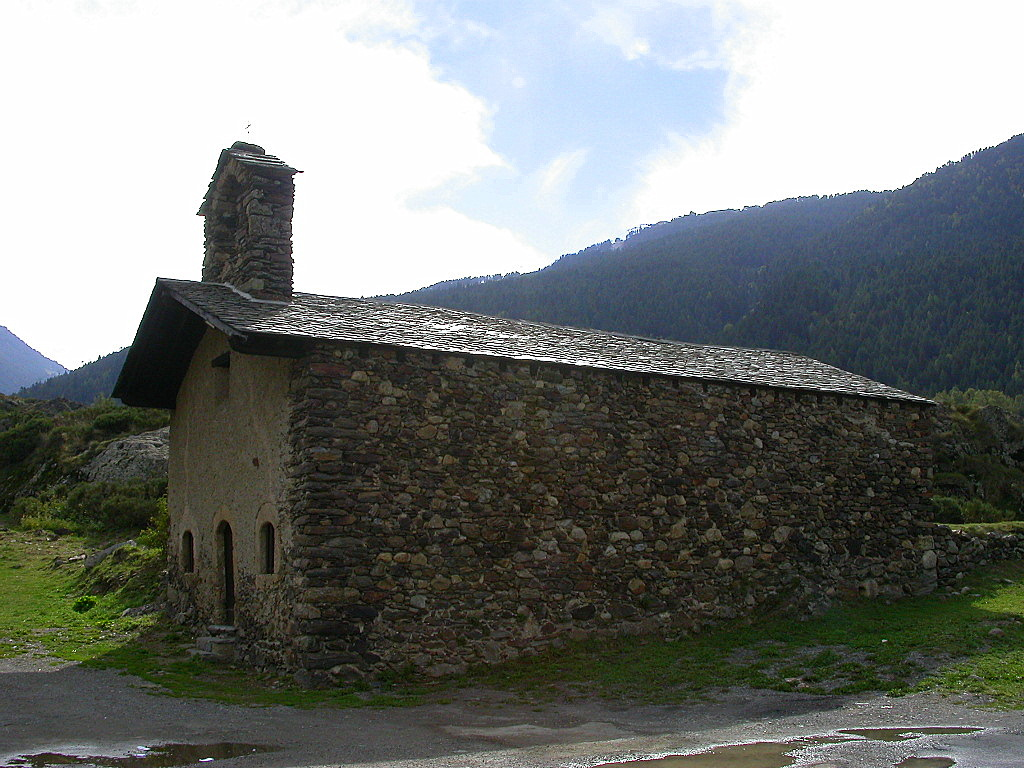
- Església de Sant Pere del Tarter

- Location in Andorra
- Coordinates: 42°35′N 1°39′E
- Country: Andorra
- Parish: Canillo
- Elevation: 1,766 m (5,794 ft)

Population (2023)
  - Total: 1,003
- Time zone: UTC+01:00 (CET)
  - Summer (DST): UTC+02:00 (CEST)

El Tarter (Catalan pronunciation: [el taɾˈte]) is a village in Andorra and one of the country's 44 official poblacions. It is located in the parish of Canillo.

== Geography ==
The village is located in the north-east of the country, near the border with France. It lies on the CG-2 main road and the Valira d'Orient, a tributary of the Gran Valira.

== Culture ==
The village is home to the Església de Sant Pere del Tarter, a Catholic church commemorating Saint Peter. Built in the 16th century, it has since been designated an Andorran cultural heritage site.
