= Meritxell =

- Basilica of Our Lady of Meritxell

- Location in Andorra
- Coordinates: 42°33′15″N 1°35′26″E
- Country: Andorra
- Parish: Canillo

Population (2012)
  - Total: 75

Meritxell (Catalan pronunciation: [məɾiˈtʃeʎ]) is a village in Andorra, located in the parish of Canillo in the north of the country near the French border. Our Lady of Meritxell is the patroness saint of Andorra.

In the village is the Basilica of Our Lady of Meritxell, which replaces the original Romanesque style sanctuary burnt down in a fire in 1972. It houses a replica of the Romanesque carving of the Virgin that was also destroyed in the fire.

The Catalan philologist Joan Coromines says that Meritxell is a diminutive of merig, from the Latin meridiem ('midday'). Merig is a name used by shepherds to denote a pasture with a lot of sun.
