= Climent Palmitjavila =

Andorran politician (1940–2021)

Climent Palmitjavila i Torres (1940 – 31 March 2021) was an Andorran politician.

He was born in 1940 in a village at the French department of Hérault from an Andorran family. In 1945 his family returned to Canillo, Andorra after the death of his uncle. During his childhood and youth, his family lived from grapes and tobacco farming and livestock raising, mainly mules, cows, horses and sheep until they set up a camping in the 1960s.

Palmitjavila was deputy mayor (cònsol menor) of Canillo between 1972 and 1973 and member of the General Council between 1986 and 1992 for Canillo parish, witnessing the signing of the Agreement in which Andorra entered the European Union Customs Union in 1991. In 2011 he was member of the Democrats for Andorra candidacy to the 2011 local elections, but as substitute.

Palmitjavila died on 31 March 2021 at the age of 80.
