= Ransol =

Village in Canillo, Andorra

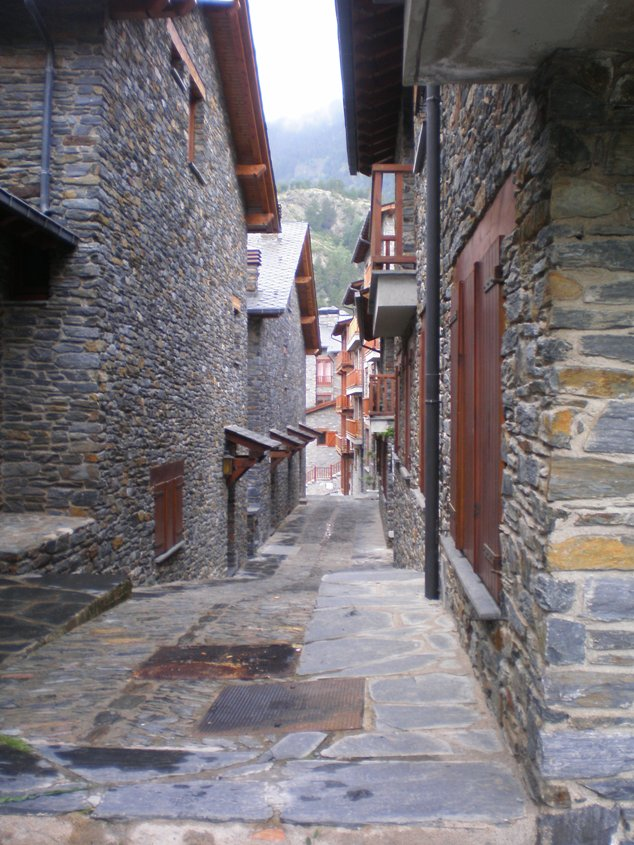
- A street in Ransol

- Location in Andorra
- Coordinates: 42°35′N 1°38′E
- Country: Andorra
- Parish: Canillo
- Elevation: 1,745 m (5,725 ft)

Population (2012)
  - Total: 294

Ransol (Catalan pronunciation: [ranˈsɔl]) is a village in Andorra, located in the parish of Canillo. The Ransol valley is particularly noted for the diversity of its flora and fauna. In 2006, the village had 188 inhabitants.
