= Canillo =

Parish in eastern Andorra

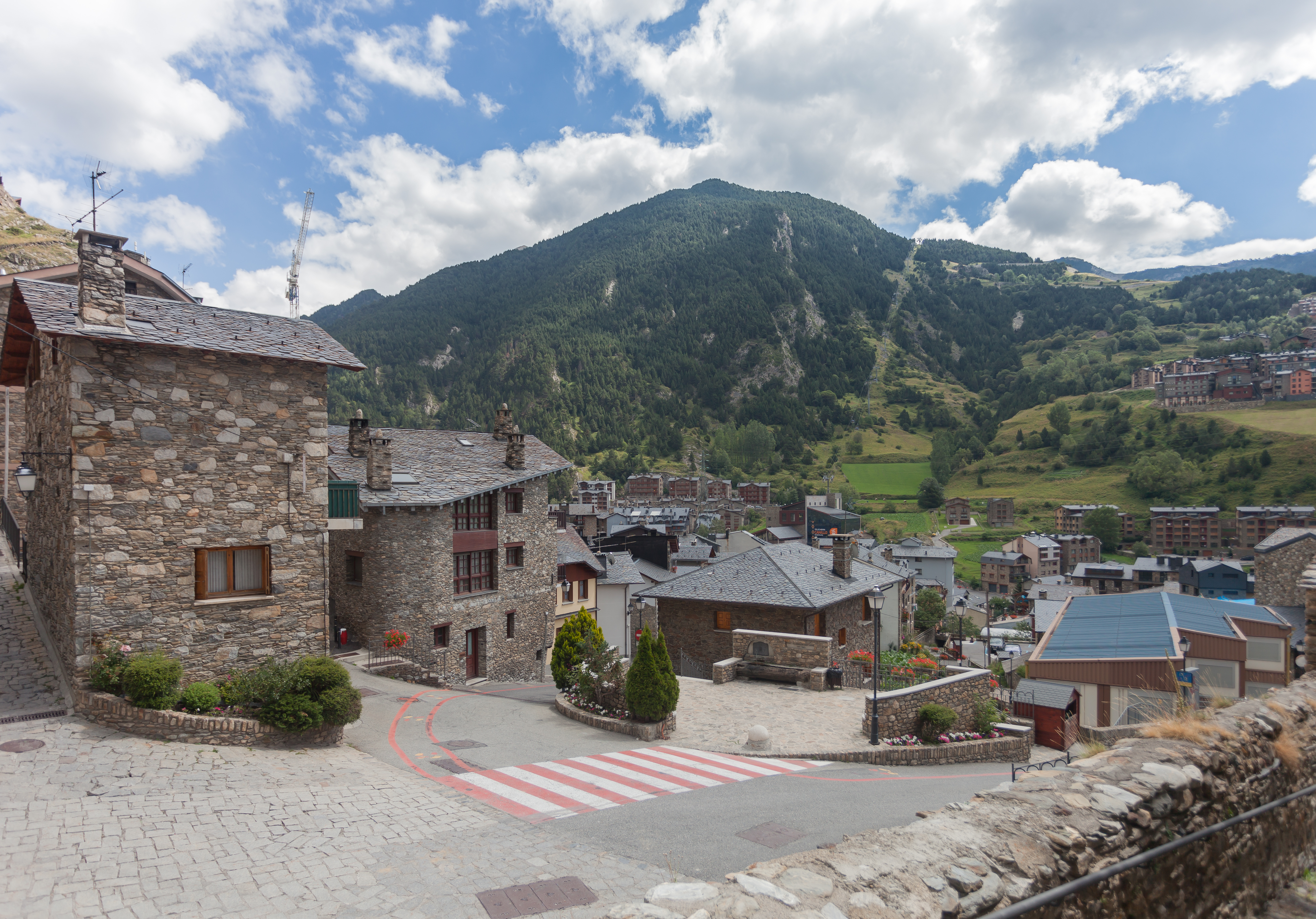
- Plaça de Sant Serni and Carrer Major of Canillo.

- Flag Coat of arms

- Location of Canillo town within Andorra
- Coordinates (Canillo town): 42°34′00″N 1°36′00″E
- Country: Andorra
- Parishes: Canillo
- Villages: Bordes d'Envalira, El Forn, El Tarter, El Vilar, Els Plans, Incles, L'Aldosa, Meritxell, Molleres, Prats, Ransol, Sant Pere, Soldeu

Government
  - Mayor: Enric Casadevall Medrano (L'A)

Area
  - Total: 121 km^{2} (47 sq mi)
- Elevation: 1,526 m (5,007 ft)

Population (2011)
  - Total: 4,826
  - Density: 42.12/km^{2} (109.1/sq mi)
- Demonym(s): canillenc, canillenca
- Postal code: AD100
- Website: Official Tourism Office of Canillo

Canillo (Catalan pronunciation: [kaˈniʎo]) is one of the seven parishes which make up Andorra. Canillo is also the name of the main town of the parish. The parish is considered the religious center of Andorra with the Sanctuary and Chapel of Our Lady of Meritxell, patron saint of Andorra, and contains one of the best-preserved romanesque churches in the Pyrenees, Sant Joan de Caselles. It has a population of 4,826 as of 2011. Despite being a tourist destination, much of the parish of Canillo is still characterised by active farms. It borders France to the north and east.

== History ==
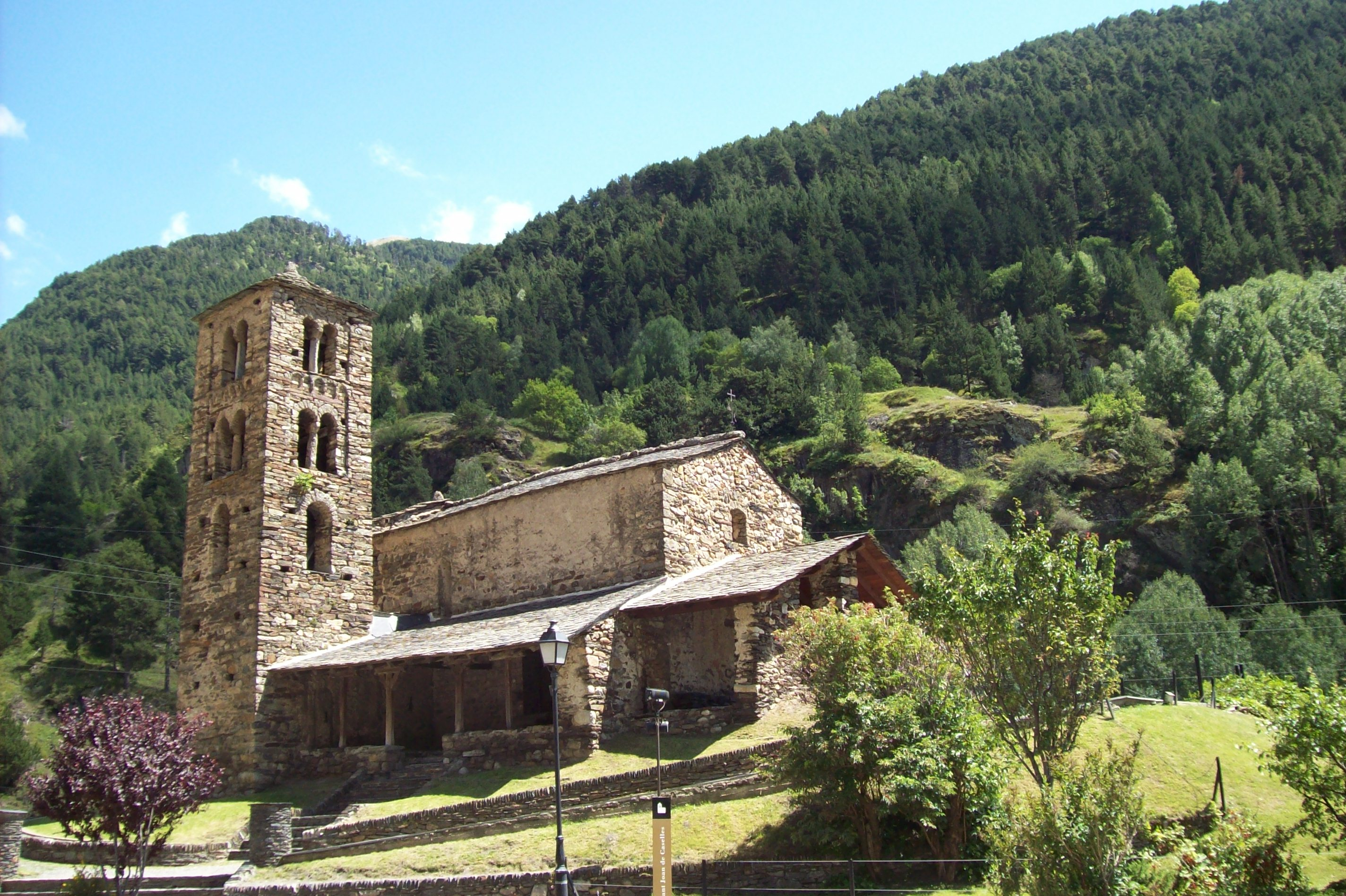
The 12th-century Romanesque church of Sant Joan de Caselles.

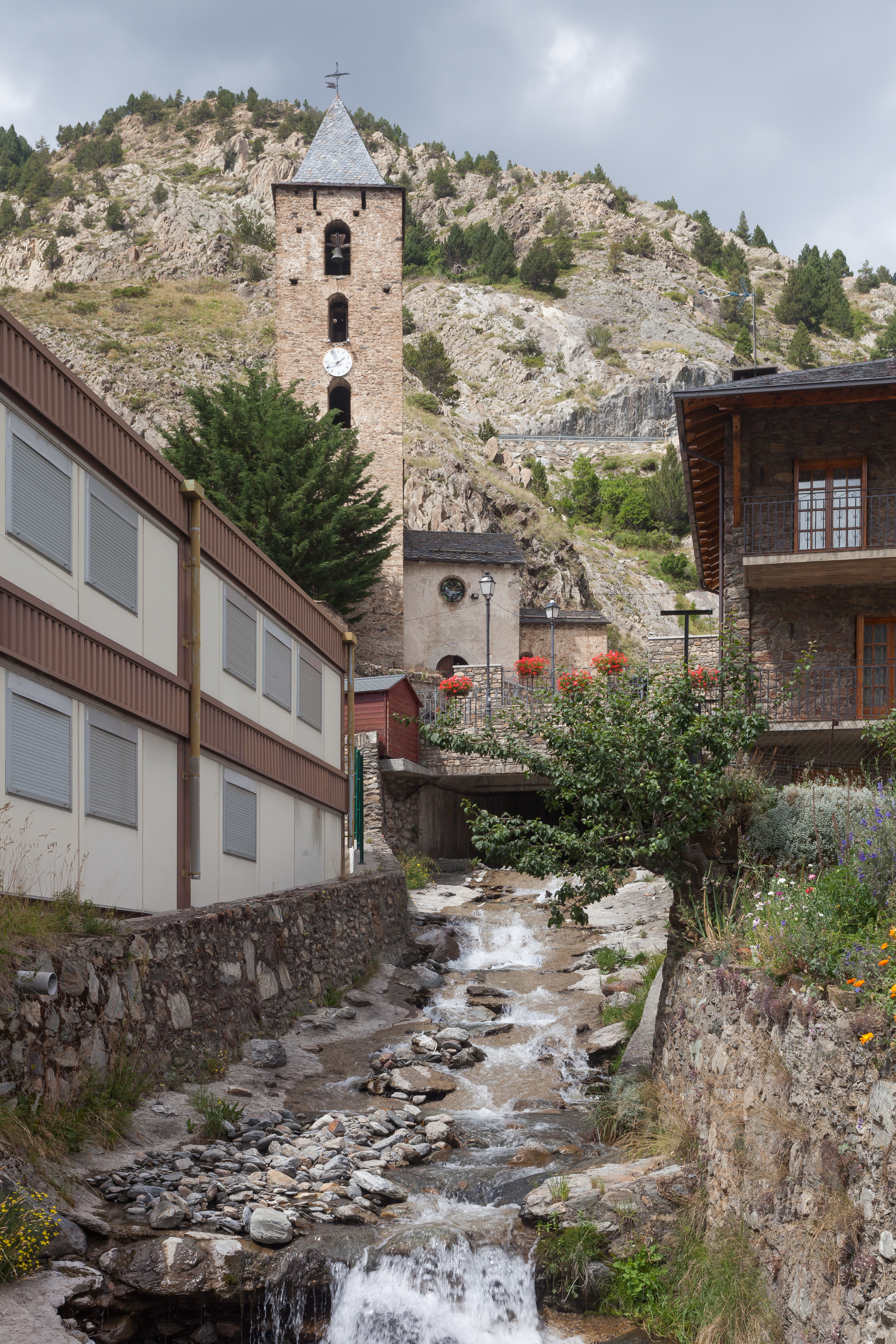
Montaup River in Canillo with the church of Sant Serni at background.

The etymological origin of the name of the parish Canillo and its capital is pre-Roman, Iberian or Celtic. It is documented for the first time in the Acta de Consagració i Dotació de la Catedral de la Seu d'Urgell (Deed of Consecration and Endowment of the Cathedral of La Seu d'Urgell), during the 9th century, as Kanillave or Sant Serni de Kanillave. Later on it was referred to as Canilau as it appears in a document from 1176.

In Prats is located the sanctuary of Roc de les Bruixes, a set of rock-engraved ritual themes dating from the Bronze Age and the Iberian era, to the Early Middle Ages. Originally it was a sacred place from where the Iberians extracted stone powder to make ointments. Late Gothic remains such as the necropolis of Sant Joan de Caselles or the one aside Sant Serni de Canillo in the late 7th and 8th century provide proof of the early Christianity in Andorra.

The parish maintains its traditional character from the Medieval Period including old mills and traditional mountain houses. Such as the flour mill of the Peano, a sample of the old sources of wealth of the country, and the buildings that can be found in the old quarter of the capital, such as Ca Armany, Cal Fluix or Cal Ferrer Nou, as well as the old quarter of Soldeu or Incles.

The church of Sant Joan de Caselles, Romanesque building from the end of the 11th century, is perhaps one of the most emblematic churches of the Principality. Inside the temple there is a Romanesque stucco Majesty on a mural painting (12th century) and a Gothic altarpiece from the 16th century with German and Italian influences. The other churches in Canillo include the parish church of Sant Serni located in the old town of Canillo, original from the 12th century with the structure and interior elements of Baroque style (17th-18th centuries), the church of Sant Miquel de Prats (12th-13th centuries) and the church of Santa Creu de Canillo (1781) located in Canillo at the river bank of the Valira river.

== Culture and folklore ==
The town figures into the Andorran legend El buner d'Ordino, in which a bagpiper from the parish of Ordino, en route to a festival in Canillo, is chased and treed by wolves, but frightens them off by playing his instrument.

The parish is intimately related to the national legend of Charlemagne. The legend explains that Charlemagne entered through the Valleys from Incles, and made a ring on the mountain of Pic Negre of Juclà to tie his horse, marking the borders between Andorra and Sabartés (Ariège), which It was in the Carolingian era Sabart, a small town today annexed to Tarascon. Not far from the place it's found the Creu Gótica de Carlemany (Gothic Cross of Charlemagne), a tribute to the blacksmiths of the country.

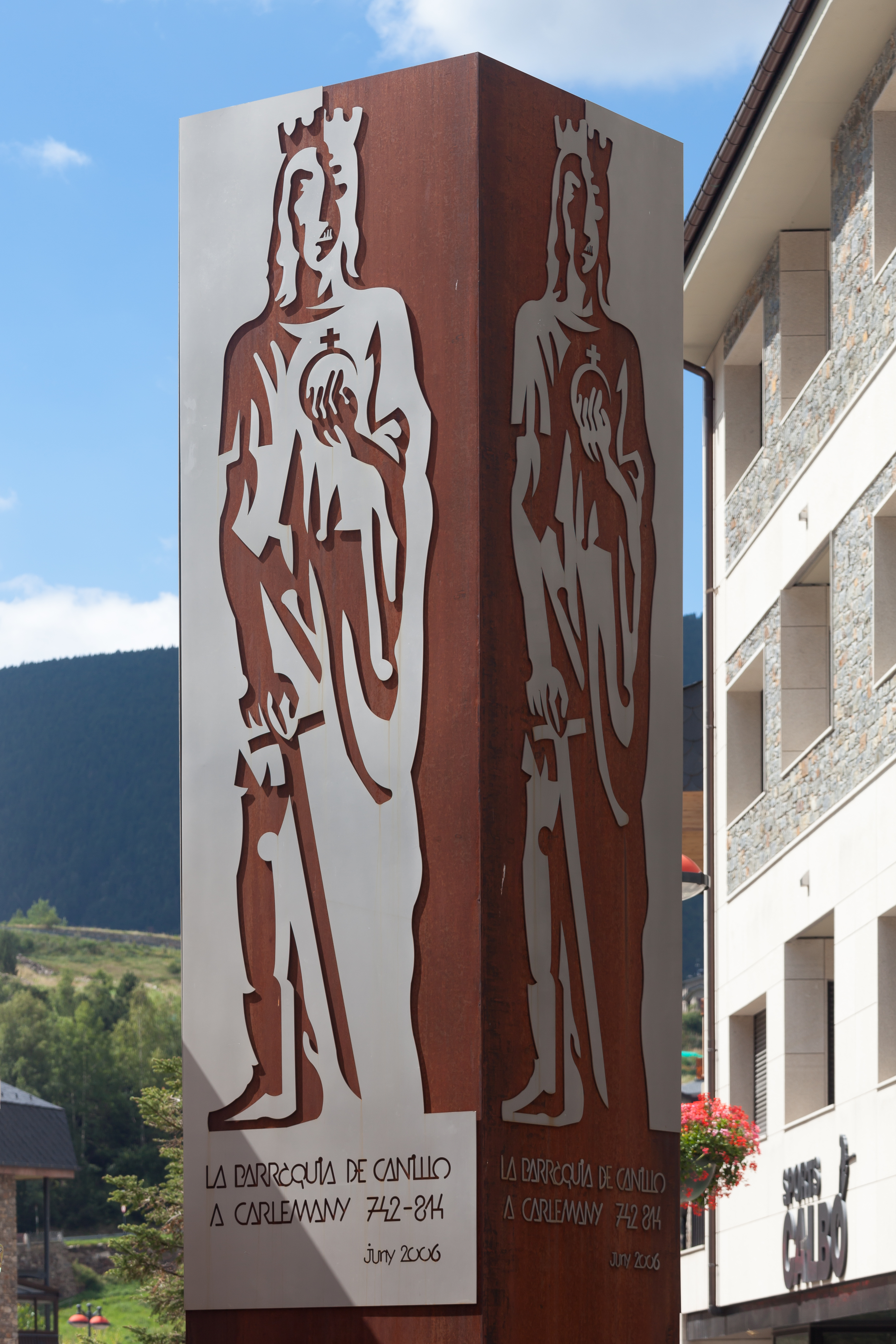
Sculpture to Carlemany located in Canillo's town.

Also the Creu dels Set Braços (Cross of the seven arms) can be found in the parish. The cross is the origin of the tragic legend about a boy from Prats who thought that the devil could go find him someday. He accidentally killed one of his friends who wanted to scare him to make him a joke after returning from the town of Canillo to bring a barrel of wine. The body disappeared mysteriously, some say by the devil himself. In the place where the accident happened, they placed a cross in order that the passers remember and removed the consequence of such ugly act. The cross had seven arms, like seven were the young people who wanted to make fun of their compatriot. One of them disappeared, and, strangely coinciding, the cross also lost one of his arms.

Canillo is the place of the Sanctuary of Our Lady of Meritxell. According to legend, a shepherd found the image of the Virgin on a winter day under some flowering roses and decided to take it home. The image, however, returned three times to the same place where it had been found. Finally, the Andorrans decided to build a chapel there. In 1873, the General Council of the Valleys declared her the patron saint of the country and on 8 September 1921 it was declared the National Holiday of the Principality.

The original sanctuary was of Romanesque style and was completely restored in the 17th century. In 1972, the sanctuary burned down, being completely destroyed along with the Romanesque statue of the Virgin. The construction of a new sanctuary was entrusted to the Spanish architect Ricardo Bofill Levi. The new building was inaugurated in 1976. Inside it is still revered a replica of the Romanesque carving statue of the Virgin that was destroyed in the fire.

The sanctuary was declared a Minor basilica on 13 May 2014 by Pope Francis and joined the Marian Route (Ruta Mariana), a cultural-religious nature route, together with Our Lady of the Pillar, Our Lady of Torreciudad, Our Lady of Montserrat and Our Lady of Lourdes.

== Geography ==
The localities of Canillo parish include Soldeu, Bordes d'Envalira, El Tarter, Sant Pere, Ransol, Els Plans, El Vilar, l'Aldosa, El Forn, Incles, Prats, Meritxell and Molleres. Unlike the rest of Andorra, Canillo is divided by veïnats (neighborhoods). Canillo Parish is Andorra's largest parish, at 121 square kilometers (47 sq mi).

Large natural places and areas in the parish include the Incles Valley, the Ransol Valley and the Montaup Valley. On the hiking trail of the Incles Valley is located the Estany de Juclà, the largest lake in Andorra, with 21.3 hectares (0.21 km^{2}).

=== Climate ===
Canillo has a humid continental climate (Köppen climate classification Dfb). The average annual temperature in Canillo is 6.2 °C (43.2 °F). The average annual rainfall is 992.2 mm (39.06 in) with May as the wettest month. The temperatures are highest on average in July, at around 15.0 °C (59.0 °F), and lowest in January, at around −1.4 °C (29.5 °F). The highest temperature ever recorded in Canillo was 36.0 °C (96.8 °F) on 1 July 1994; the coldest temperature ever recorded was −23.0 °C (−9.4 °F) on 11 February 1956.

Climate data for Canillo (1981–2010 averages, extremes 1934−2017)
Month	Jan	Feb	Mar	Apr	May	Jun	Jul	Aug	Sep	Oct	Nov	Dec	Year
Record high °C (°F)	16.0 (60.8)	17.0 (62.6)	20.0 (68.0)	22.0 (71.6)	29.0 (84.2)	35.0 (95.0)	36.0 (96.8)	32.0 (89.6)	29.0 (84.2)	24.0 (75.2)	20.0 (68.0)	14.0 (57.2)	36.0 (96.8)
Mean daily maximum °C (°F)	2.7 (36.9)	5.0 (41.0)	8.0 (46.4)	9.4 (48.9)	13.7 (56.7)	18.7 (65.7)	22.5 (72.5)	22.0 (71.6)	17.8 (64.0)	12.8 (55.0)	6.4 (43.5)	3.0 (37.4)	11.9 (53.4)
Daily mean °C (°F)	−1.4 (29.5)	−0.3 (31.5)	2.4 (36.3)	4.0 (39.2)	7.8 (46.0)	12.0 (53.6)	15.0 (59.0)	14.7 (58.5)	11.2 (52.2)	7.2 (45.0)	2.2 (36.0)	−0.8 (30.6)	6.2 (43.2)
Mean daily minimum °C (°F)	−5.5 (22.1)	−5.5 (22.1)	−3.3 (26.1)	−1.4 (29.5)	1.9 (35.4)	5.3 (41.5)	7.6 (45.7)	7.5 (45.5)	4.6 (40.3)	1.6 (34.9)	−1.9 (28.6)	−4.5 (23.9)	0.6 (33.1)
Record low °C (°F)	−20.2 (−4.4)	−23.0 (−9.4)	−18.0 (−0.4)	−13.0 (8.6)	−7.0 (19.4)	−5.0 (23.0)	−1.0 (30.2)	−1.0 (30.2)	−6.0 (21.2)	−10.0 (14.0)	−14.0 (6.8)	−19.0 (−2.2)	−23.0 (−9.4)
Average precipitation mm (inches)	68.8 (2.71)	42.7 (1.68)	56.7 (2.23)	94.8 (3.73)	106.4 (4.19)	100.5 (3.96)	73.8 (2.91)	88.1 (3.47)	95.8 (3.77)	95.4 (3.76)	87.9 (3.46)	81.3 (3.20)	992.2 (39.06)
Average precipitation days (≥ 1.0 mm)	8.1	6.6	8.1	11.8	12.7	9.8	7.4	8.6	7.8	9.2	8.6	8.2	107.0
Source: Météo France

=== Events and festivities ===
One of the earliest celebrations in Canillo during January is Sant Antoni, in which the traditional markets are celebrated and vianda is distributed, which is a mountain soup. The crema del mai (burning of mai) is celebrated to left behind the hard winter: traditionally a spruce fir tree was burned and people in town sang and danced around it until the flames consumed it. The tree is still burning up nowadays, one of those used as a decoration on the public road during Christmas, and theater groups encourage the party for the little ones.

Another very deeply rooted festival is the Carnival, also known as the Harlequin Festival, where the typical costume is that of harlequin, which is made out of clothes and scrolls (bells) and appears after the hanging of the king Carnival or rei Carnestoltes.

Already in the middle of the summer, the Canillo Festival is celebrated and began the Sheepdog Contest at the Planells de Mereig, organized by the local government and the Association of the Canillo Sheepdog Contest, as part of the Championship of the Catalan Countries.

== Sports ==
Soldeu-El Tarter hosted World Cup alpine events for the first time in February 2012; and then in February 2016 a super-G and a combined. The World Cup finals (eight events) are scheduled for Soldeu in March 2019.

During the summer, mountain activities such as railroads, hiking and climbing routes are organized in the parish, as well as bike and cycling routes in Grand Valira and Vall d'Incles. In Canillo is located the highest golf course in Europe, located at 2,250 m altitude (7382 feet), created by the British architect Jeremy Pern.

The Palau de Gel d'Andorra, sports and leisure center located in Canillo for ice skating, ice hockey and curling is the headquarters of the Andorran Federation of Ice Sports and clubs. It will host 2025 IIHF Development Cup.

== Demographics ==
Historical population
Year	Pop.	±%
1970	420	—
1980	755	+79.8%
1990	1,513	+100.4%
2000	2,808	+85.6%
2010	6,194	+120.6%
2020	5,320	−14.1%
Source: Departament d'Estadística

The largest ethnic group in Canillo are Andorrans. There is also a significant number of Spaniards and Portuguese people. The following table shows the largest foreign ethnic groups in Canillo by nationality, as of 2013:

Rank	Nationality	Population (2013)
1	Spain	1,201
2	Portugal	542
3	France	433
4	United Kingdom	147
5	Argentina	110

== Notable people ==
- Pere Areny (1913–1943) last person to be executed by Andorra; born in Canillo
- Carles Font-Rossell (born 1967 in Canillo) was the Permanent Representative to the United Nations for Andorra and also Ambassador of Andorra to the United States
- Xavier Capdevila Romero (born 1976 in Canillo) an Andorran ski mountaineer, he now lives in Escaldes-Engordany
- Marc Casal (born 1987 in Canillo) is an Andorran figure skater
- Magda Marquet (born 1958 in Canillo) is an Andorran biotechnologist and businesswoman
- Miquel Naudí (1948–2026) was an Andorran politician
- Climent Palmitjavila (1940–2021) was an Andorran politician

== Gallery ==
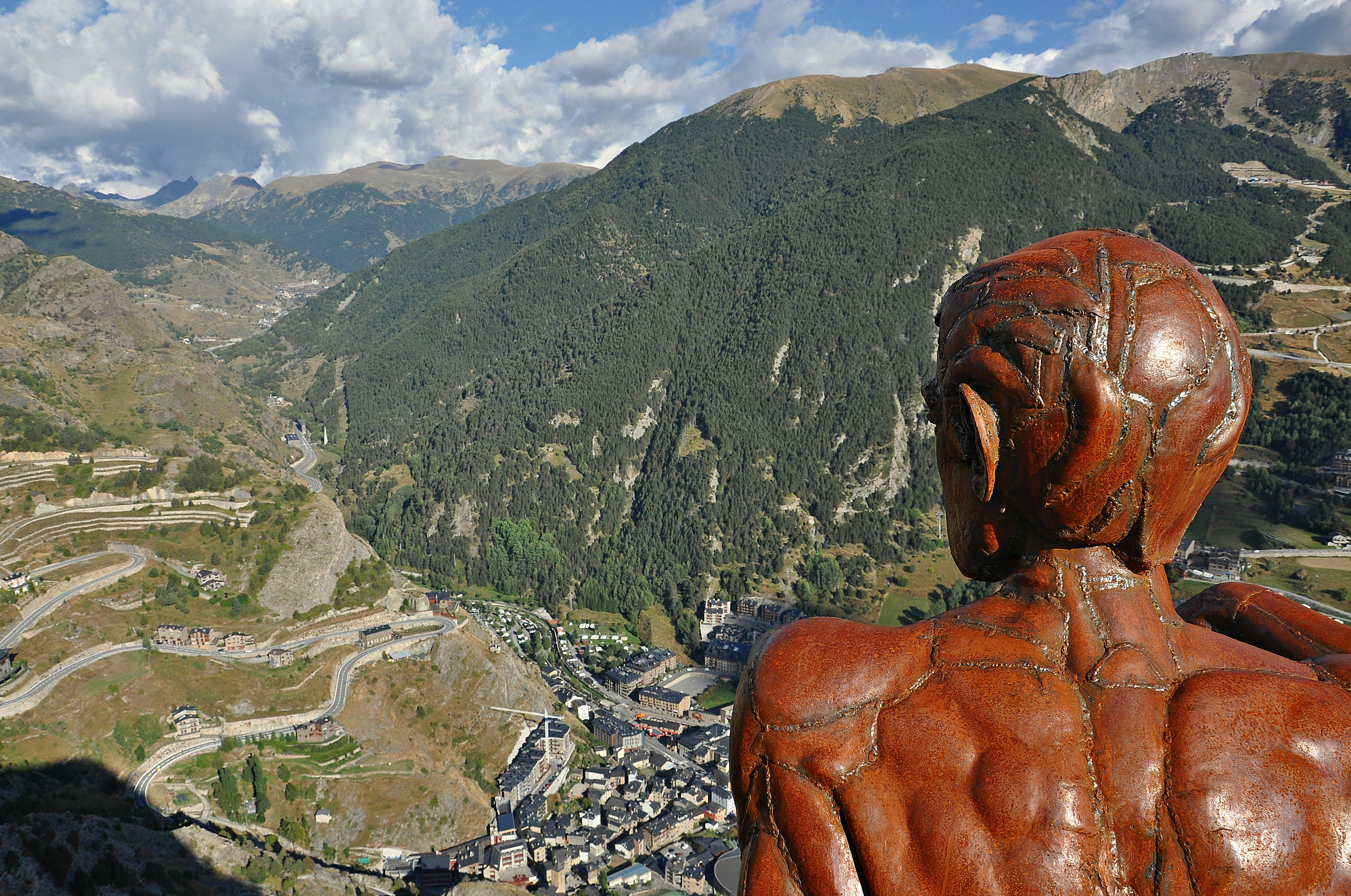
View of Canillo town from Roc del Quer

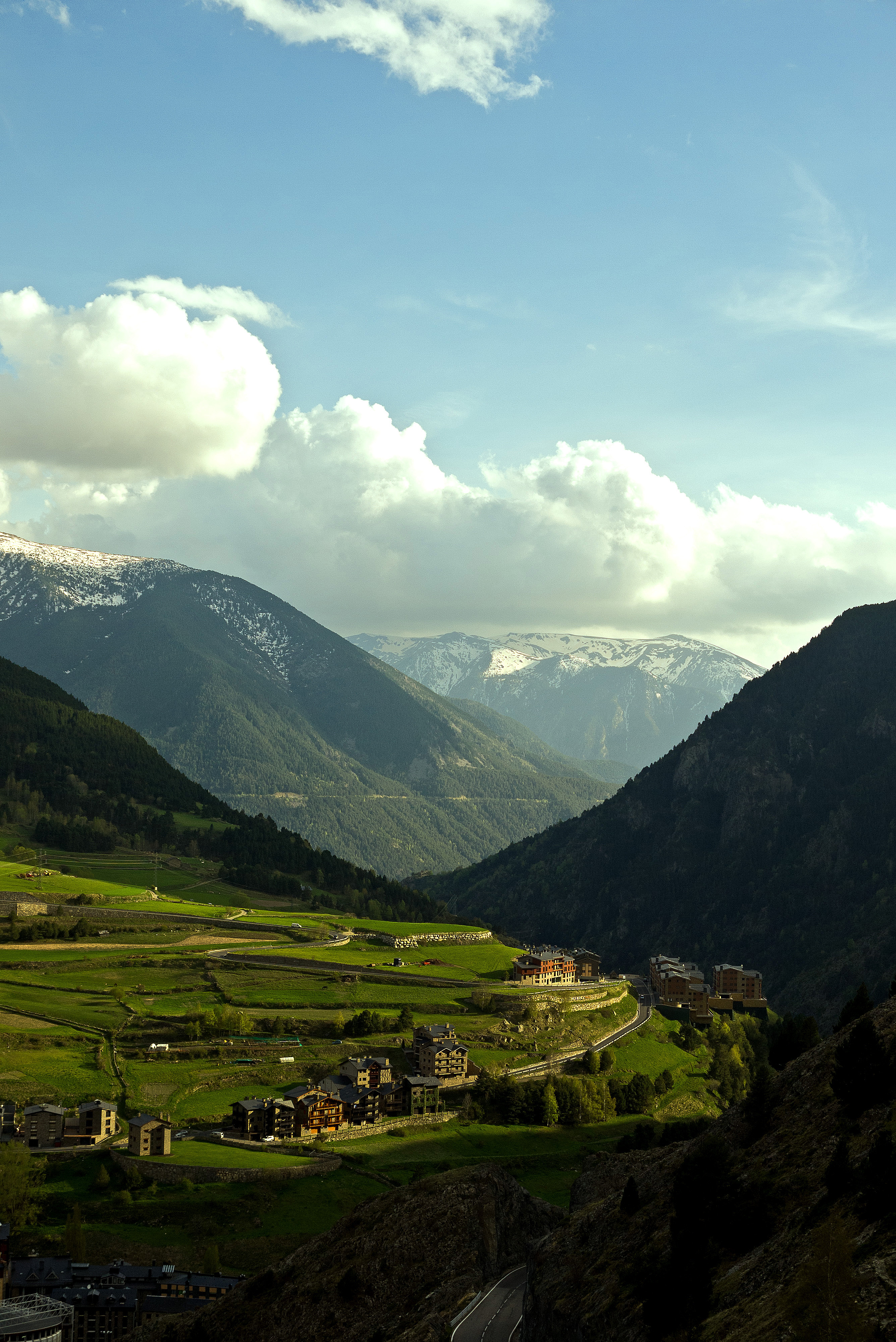
Montaup

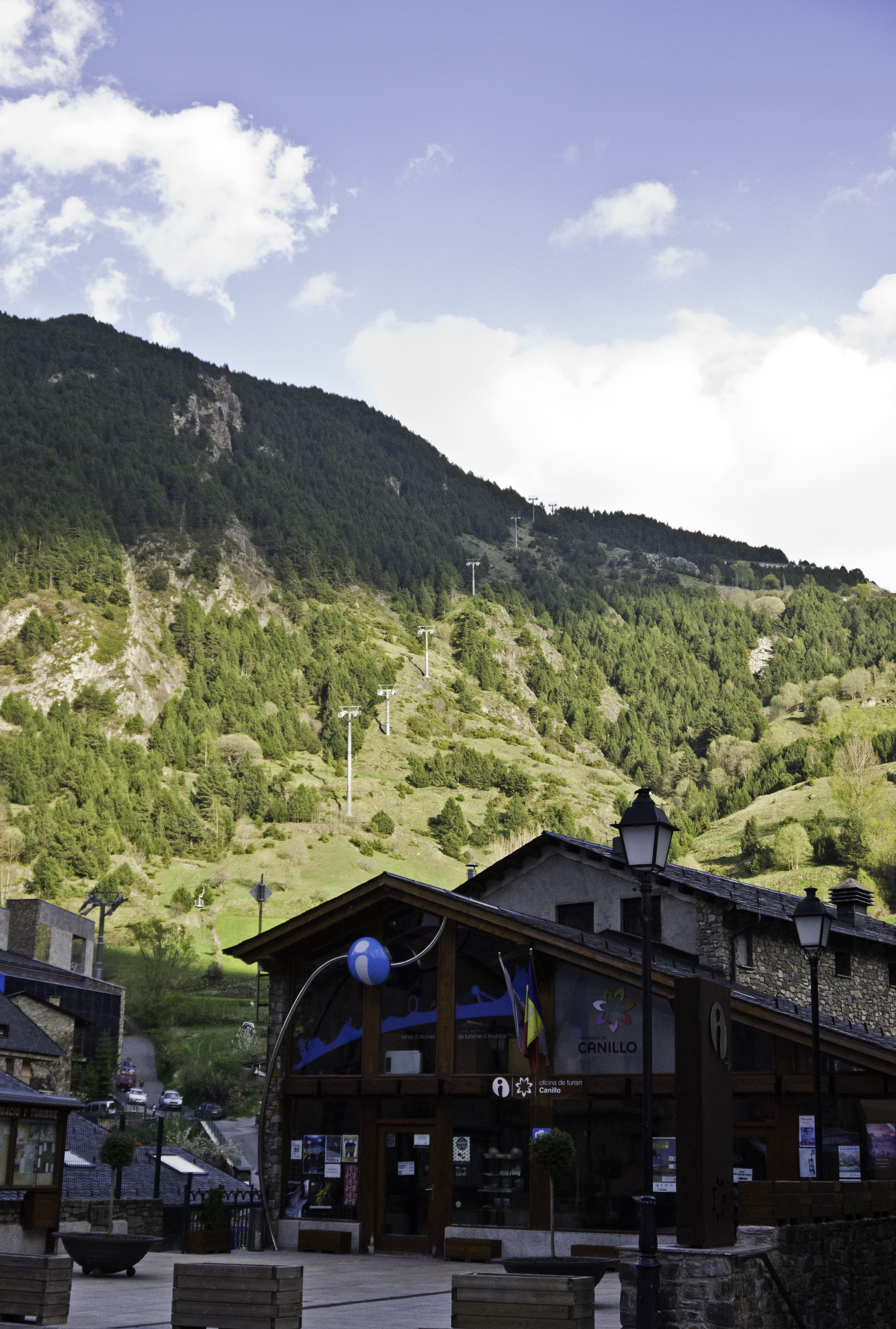
Prat del Riu

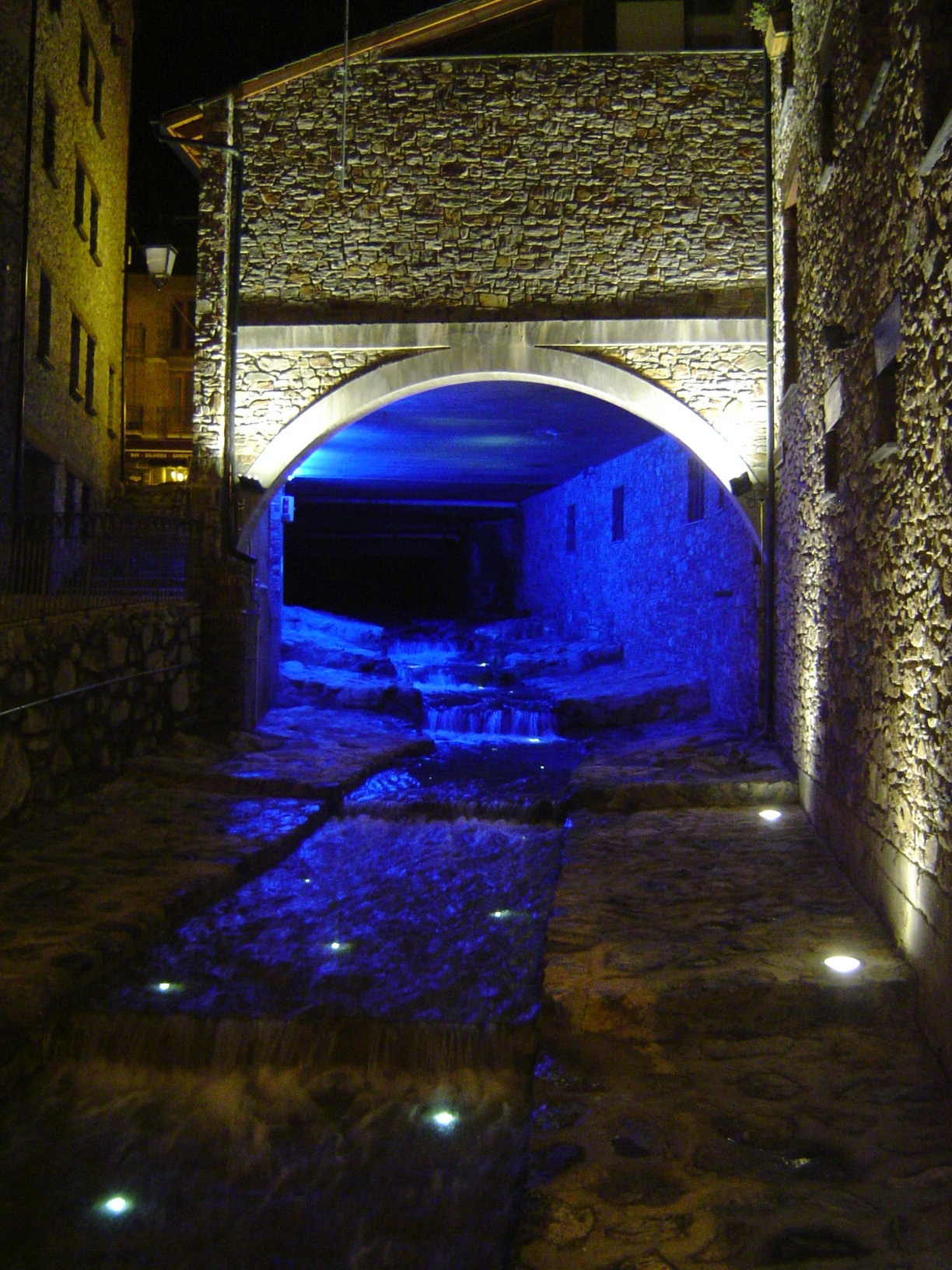
Old Mill of Canillo

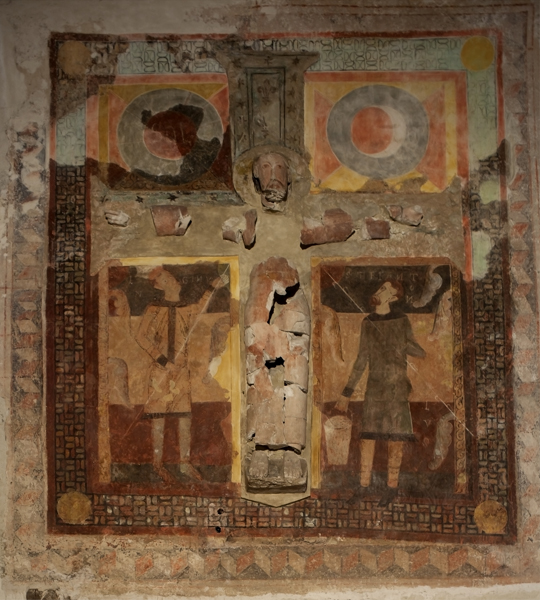
Crist Majestat of Sant Joan de Caselles

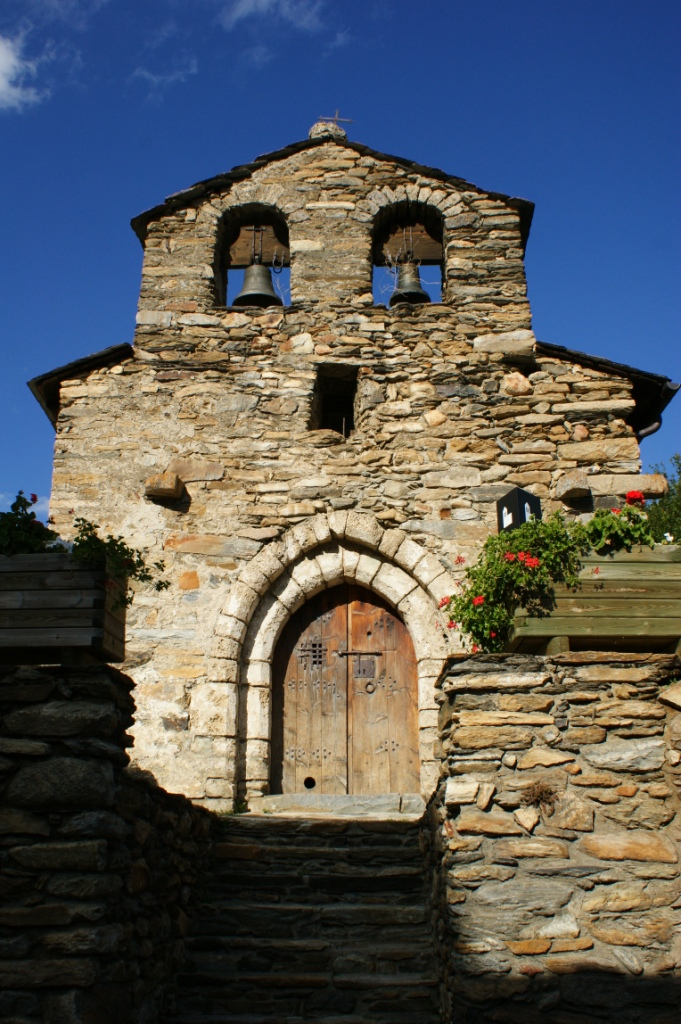
Sant Miquel de Prats

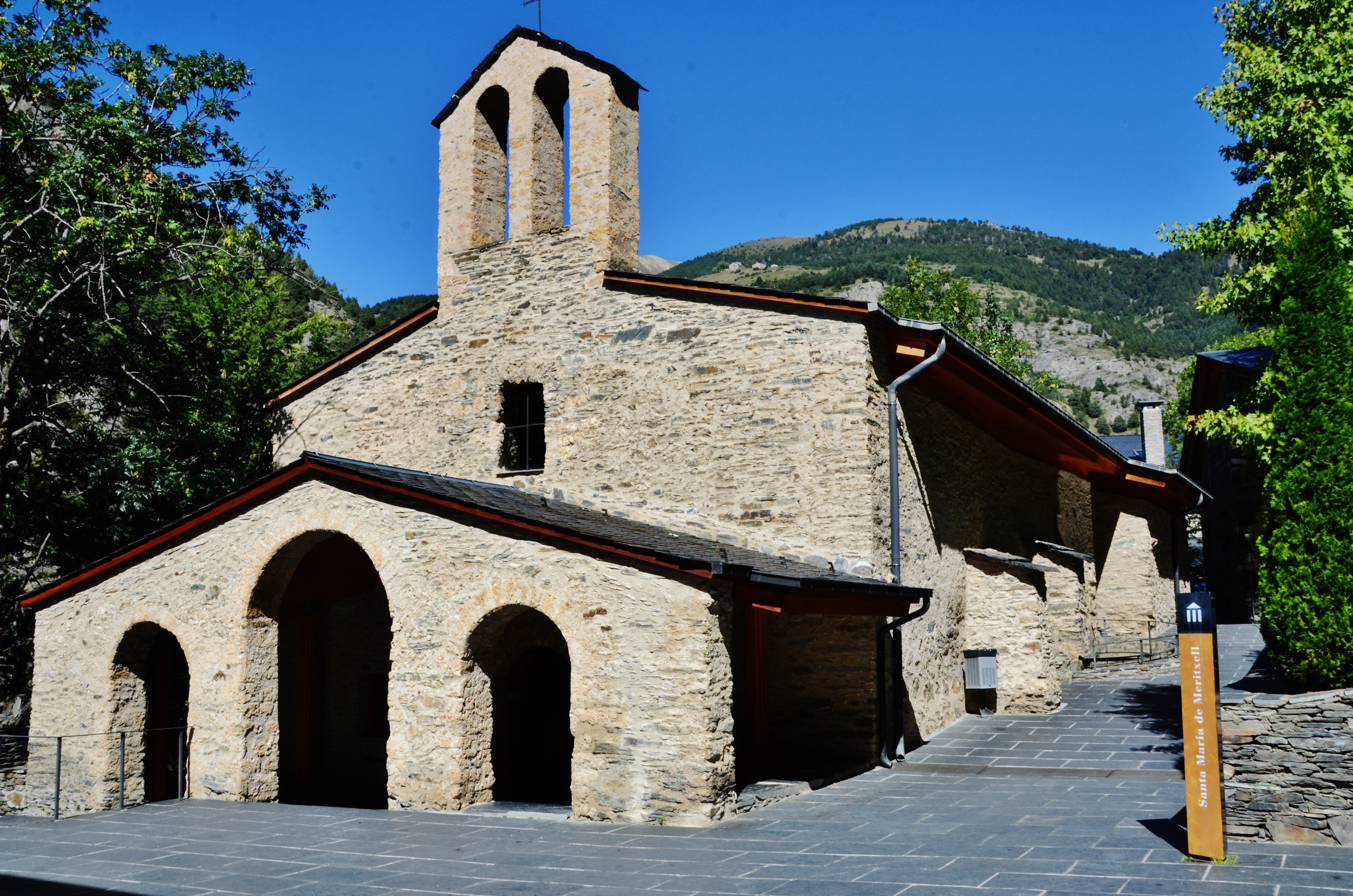
Old Sanctuary of Our Lady of Meritxell

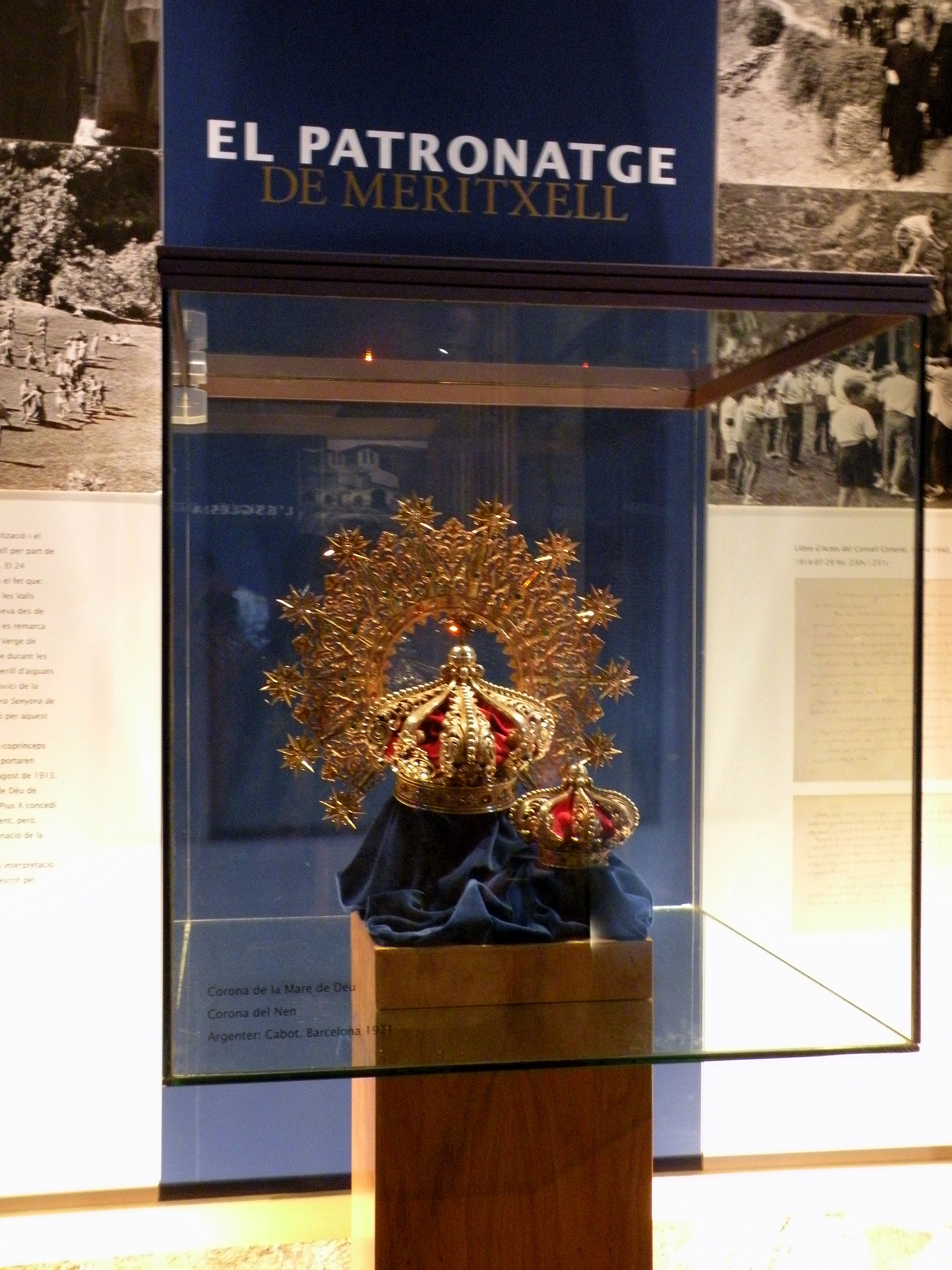
Crown of Our Lady of Meritxell

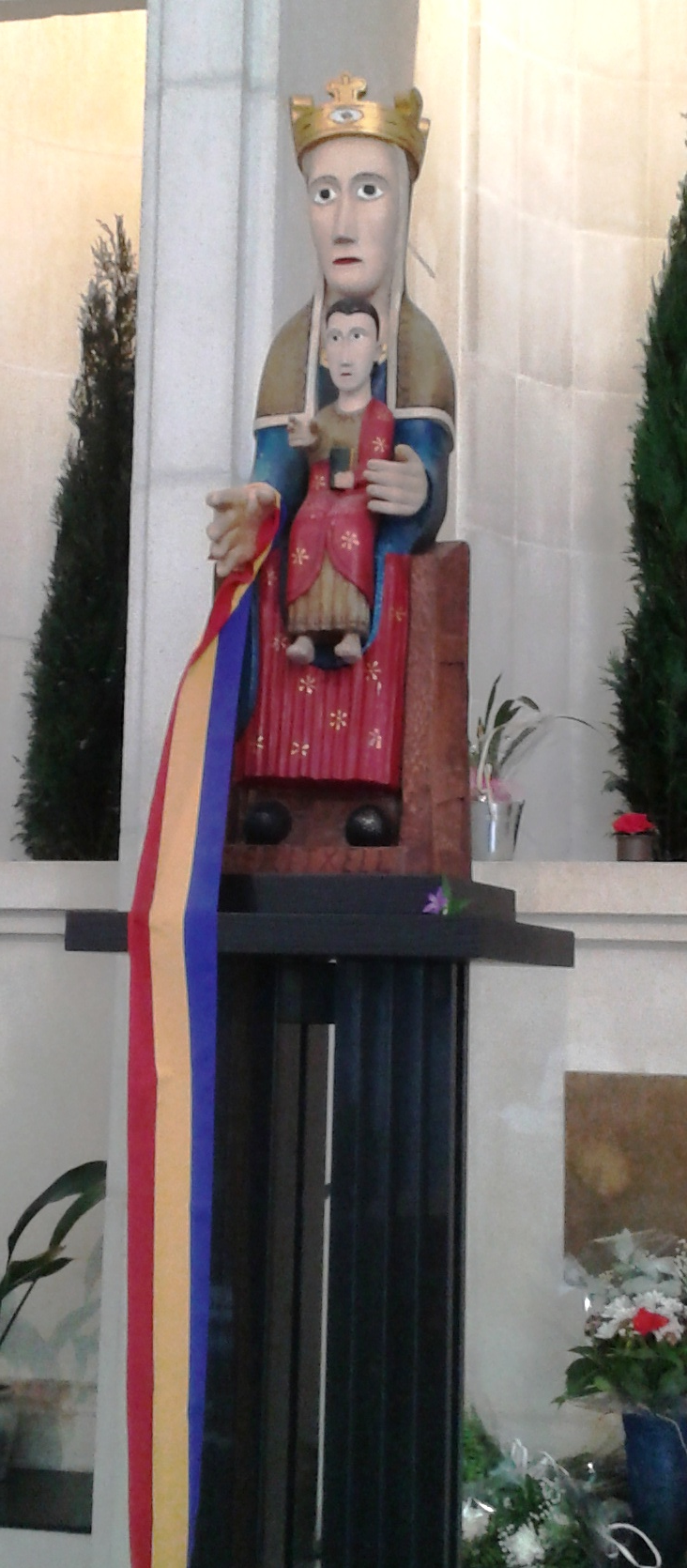
Our Lady of Meritxell

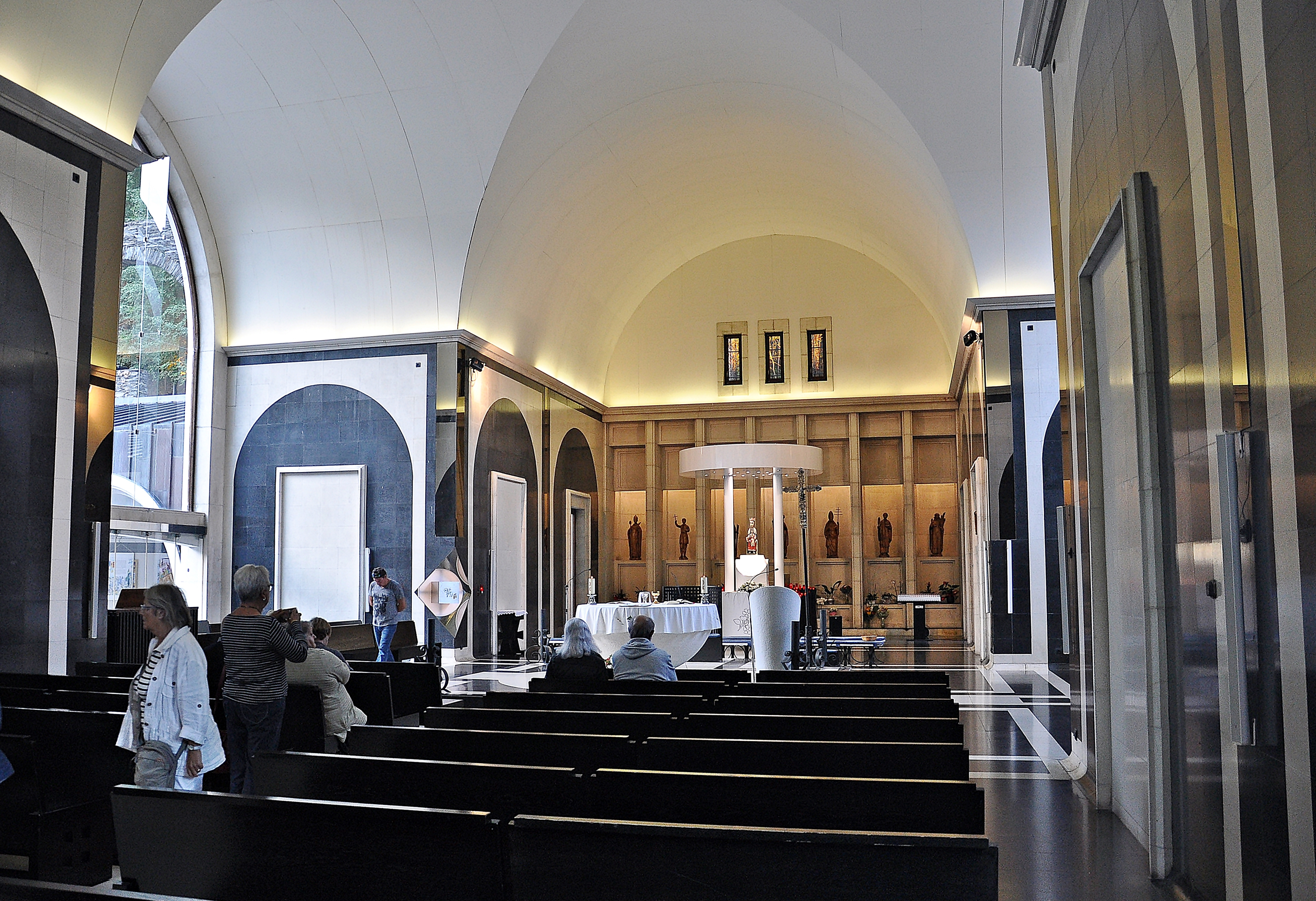
Inside the New Sanctuary

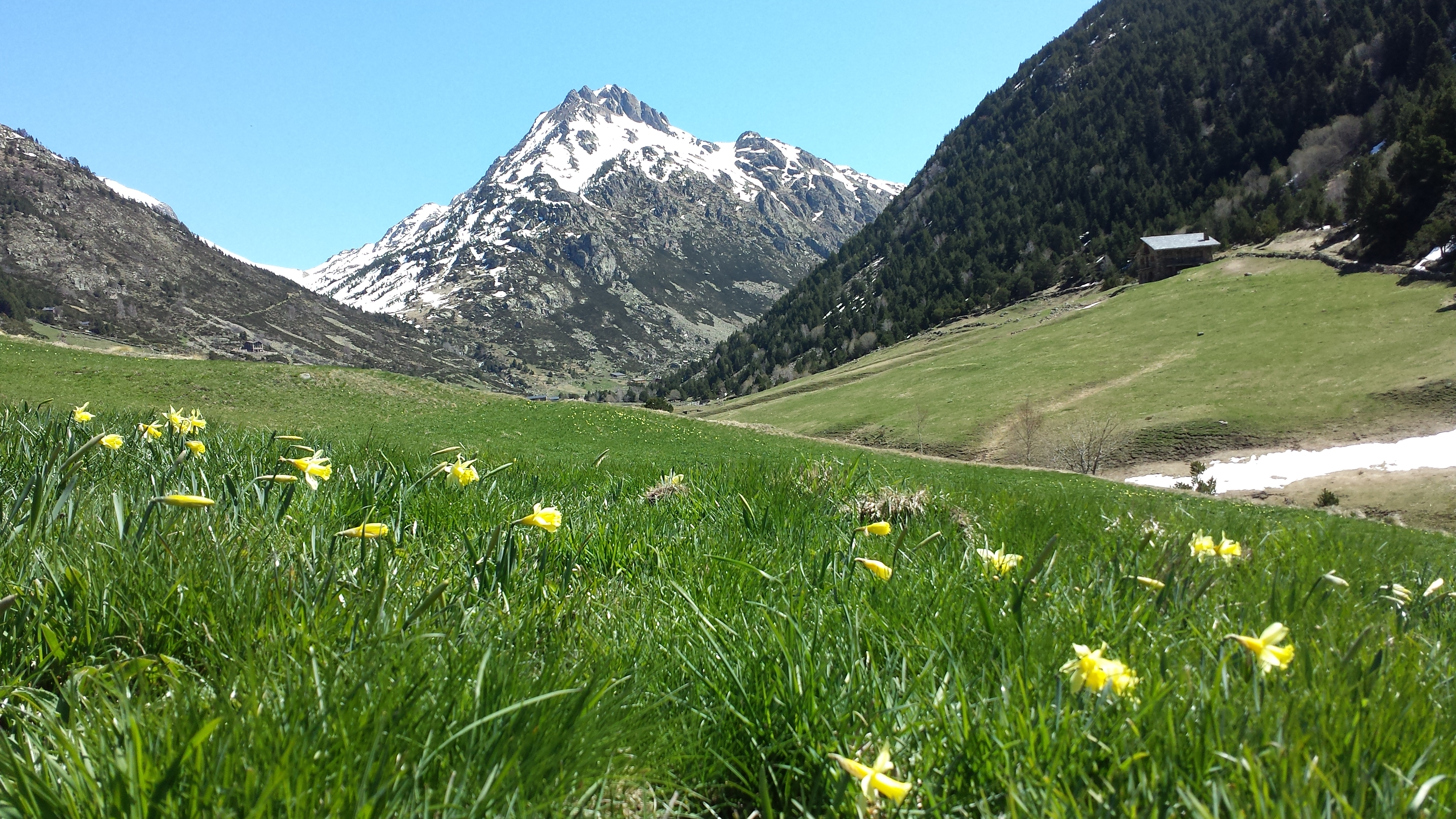
Vall d'Incles

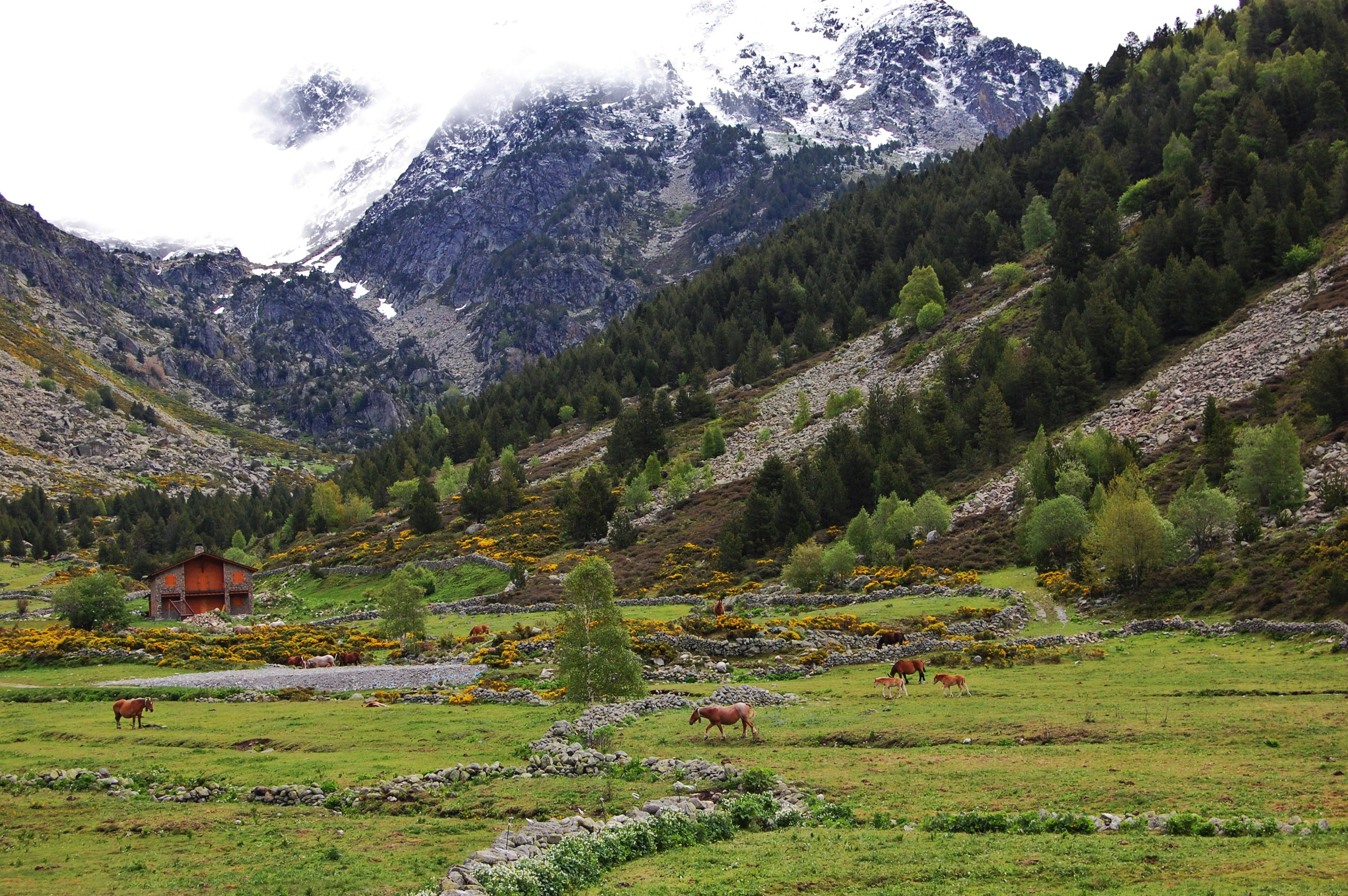
La Solana d'Andorra

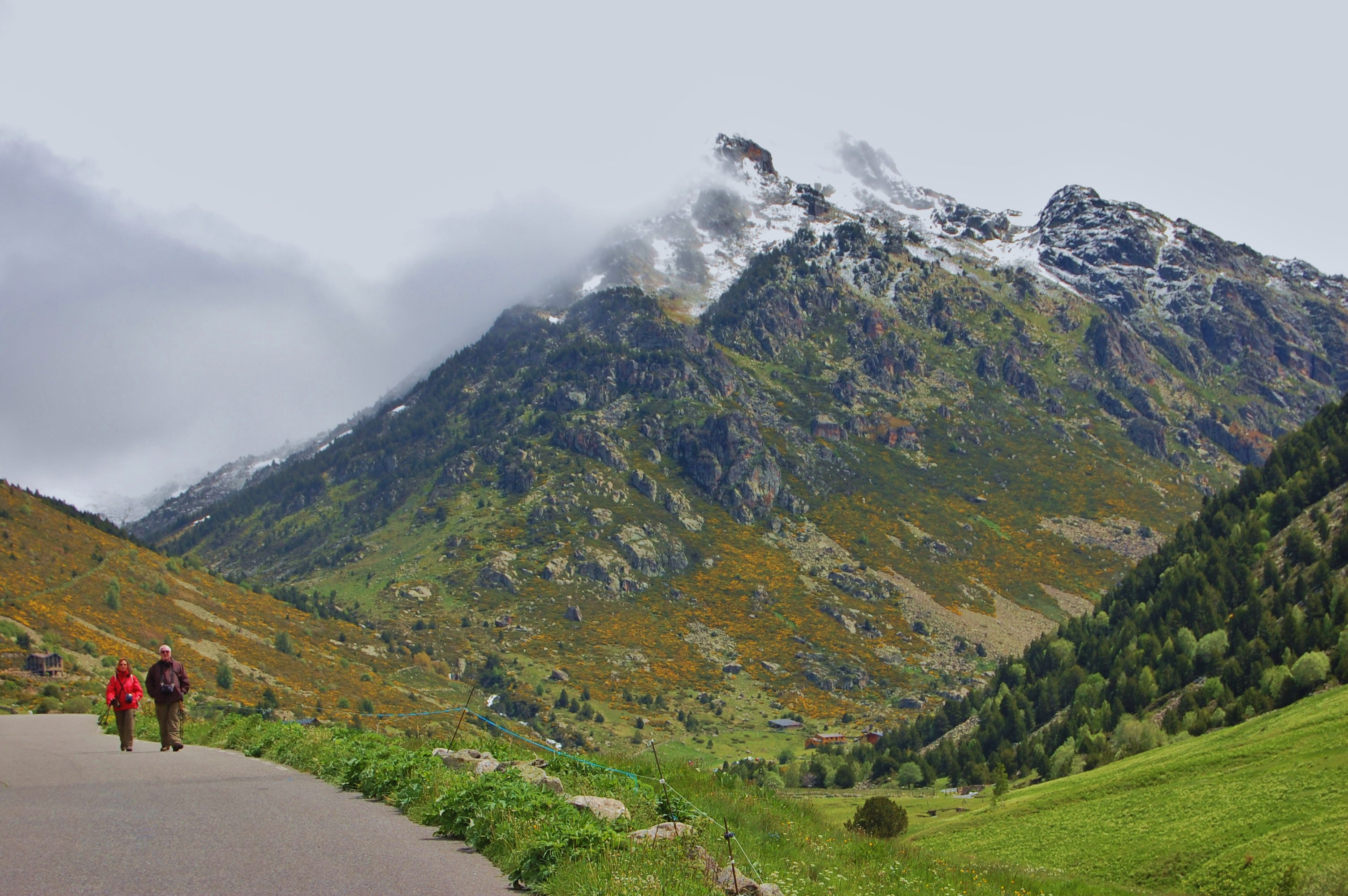
Manegor

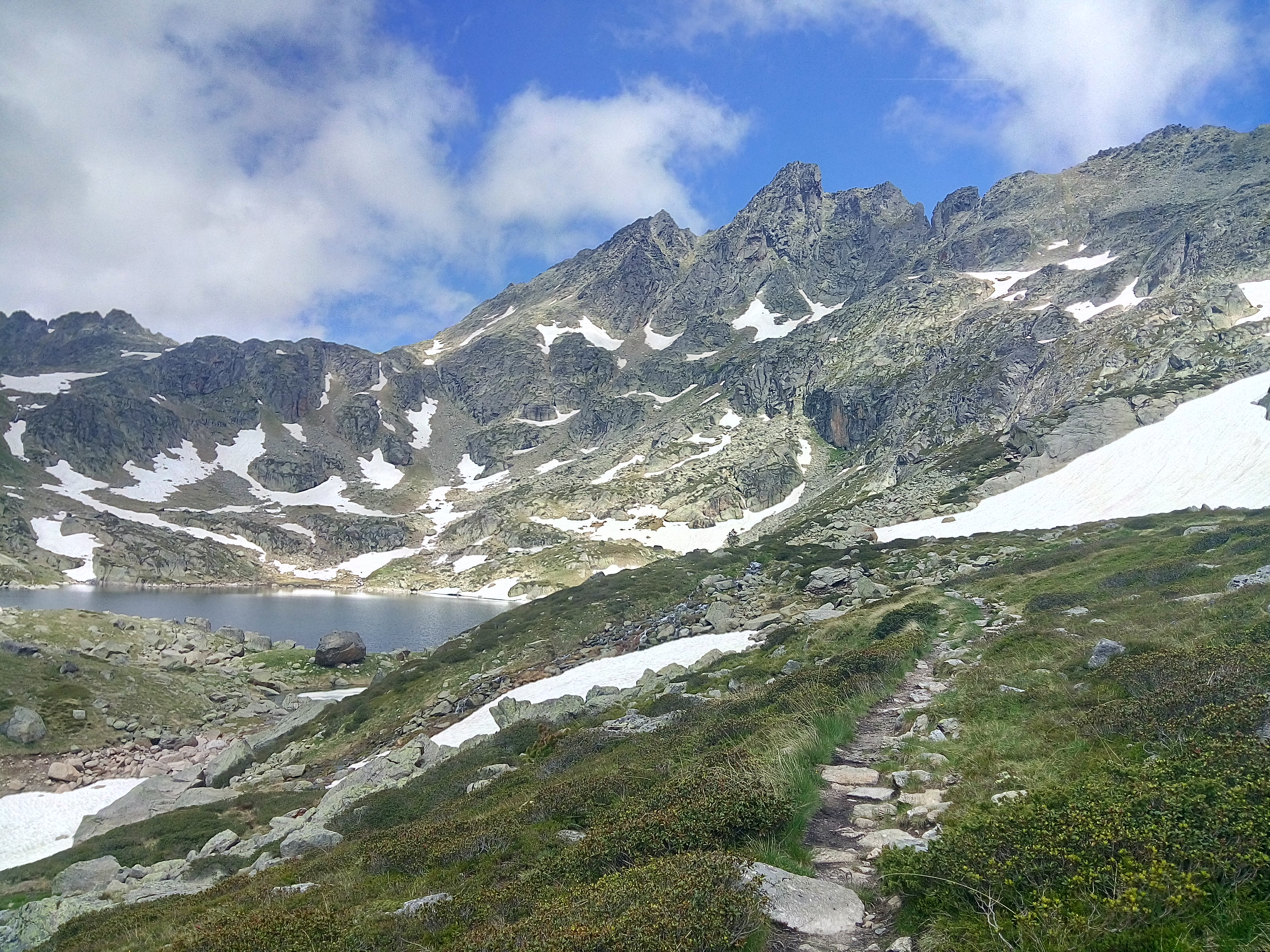
Pic d'Escobes
