= Prats, Andorra =

Village in Canillo, Andorra

Prats
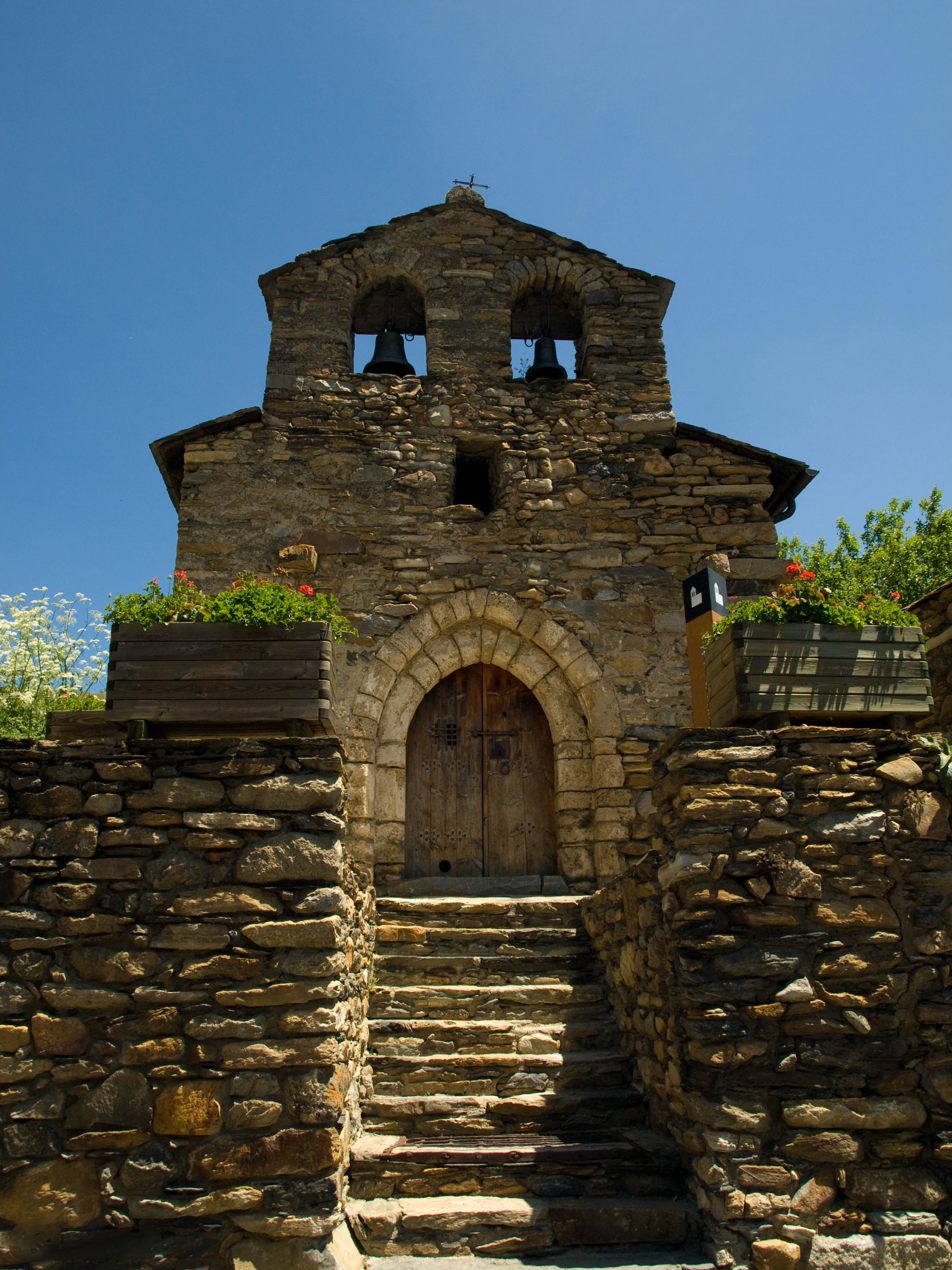
- Església de Sant Miquel de Prats

- Location in Andorra
- Coordinates: 42°34′N 1°36′E
- Country: Andorra
- Parish: Canillo
- Elevation: 6,457 ft (1,968 m)

Population (2012)
  - Total: 60

Prats (Catalan pronunciation: [ˈpɾats]) is a small village in Andorra, located in the parish of Canillo. It is part of the active slow-moving landslide of El Forn de Canillo.
