= L'Aldosa de Canillo =

Village in Canillo, Andorra

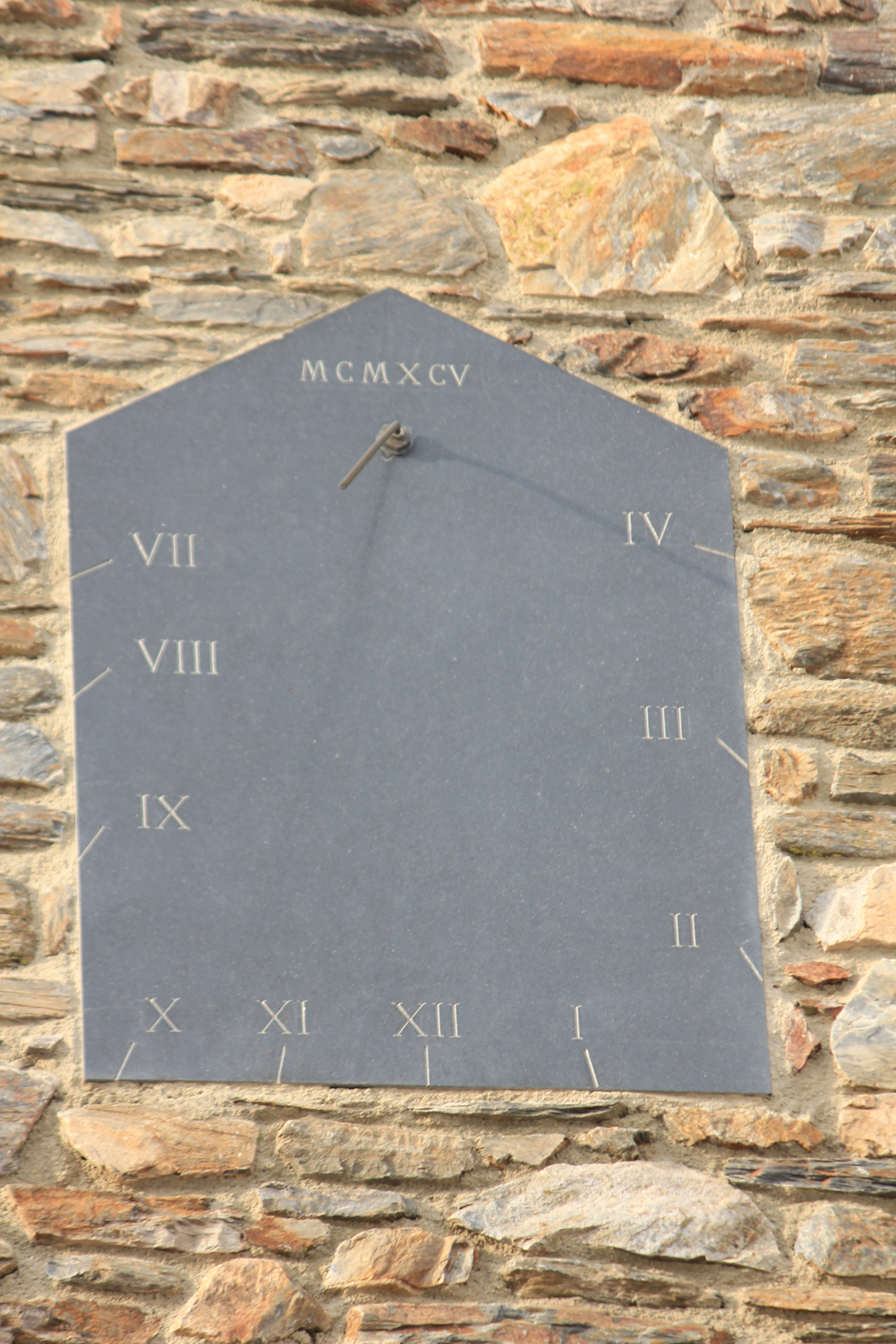
- Sundial on a house in the center of L'Aldosa de Canillo

- Location in Andorra
- Coordinates: 42°34′40″N 1°37′10″E
- Country: Andorra
- Parish: Canillo

Population (2005)
  - Total: 194

L'Aldosa de Canillo (Catalan pronunciation: [lalˈdoza ðe kaˈniʎo]), known simply as L'Aldosa, is a village in Andorra, located in the parish of Canillo.
