= Parishes of Andorra =

Parishes of Andorra Parròquies d'Andorra (Catalan)
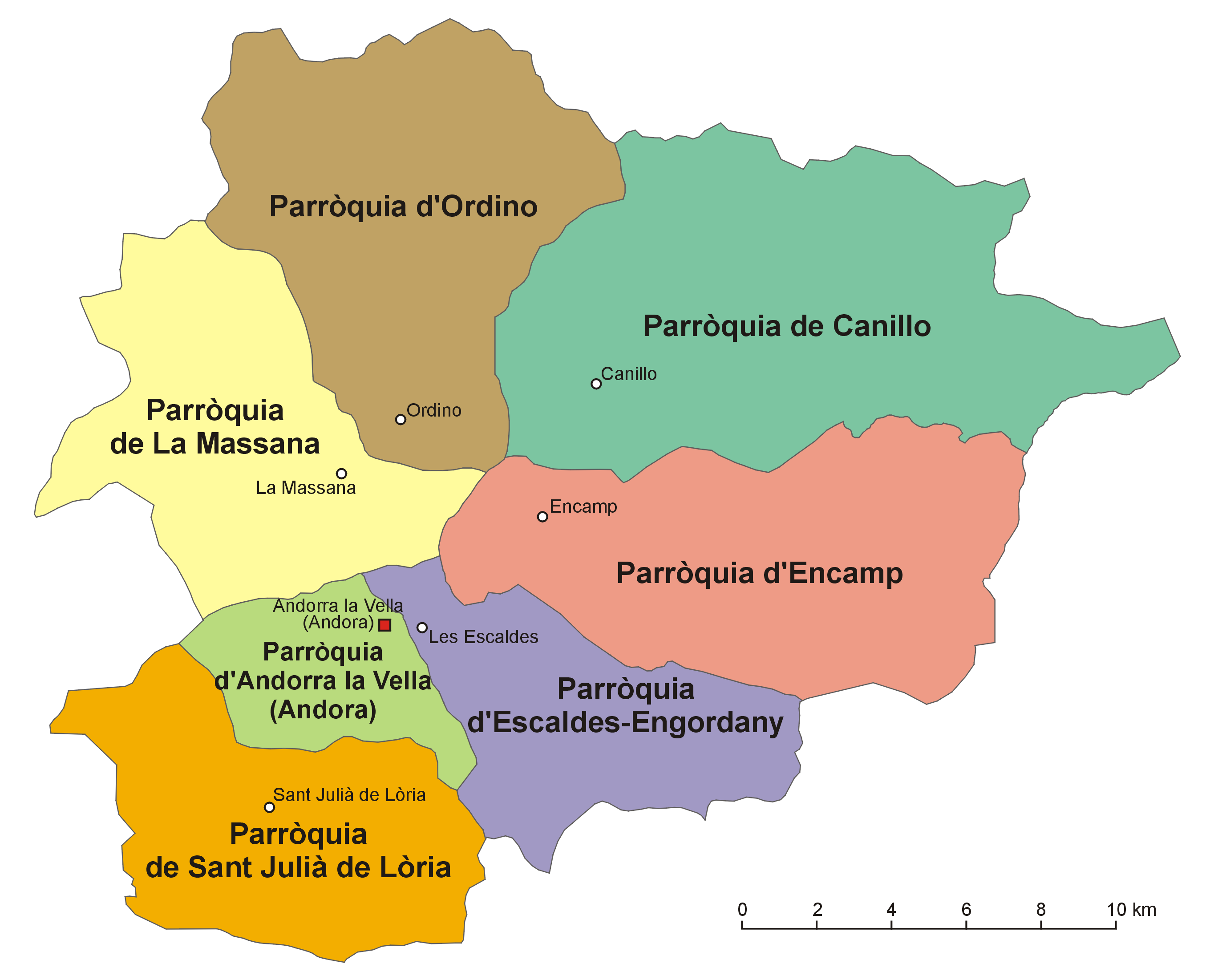
- Category: Unitary state
- Location: Principality of Andorra
- Number: 7 parishes
- Populations: 4,325 Canillo – 22,440 Andorra la Vella
- Areas: 12 km^{2} (4.6 sq mi) Andorra la Vella – 121 km^{2} (47 sq mi) Canillo
- Government: Parish government
- Subdivisions: Village

Andorra consists of seven communities known as parishes (Catalan: parròquies, singular - parròquia). There were six parishes until 1978, when the seventh, Escaldes-Engordany, was created.

== Overview ==
Andorra la Vella is the capital of Andorra. Some parishes have a further territorial subdivision; Ordino, La Massana and Sant Julià de Lòria are subdivided into quarts (quarters), while Canillo is subdivided into 10 veïnats (neighborhoods). Those mostly coincide with villages, which are found in all parishes.

Each parish has its own elected mayor who is the nominal head of the local government known as a comú in Catalan.

Flag	Parish	ISO 3166-2	Area		Population					Population density
Flag	Parish	ISO 3166-2	km^{2}	mi^{2}	1990	2000	2007	2015	2019	per km^{2} in 2019
Coat of arms of Andorra la Vella	Andorra la Vella	AD-07	12	4.6	19,022	21,189	24,574	21,428	22,440	1,870
Coat of arms of Canillo	Canillo	AD-02	121	47	1,290	2,706	5,422	3,368	4,325	35.74
Coat of arms of Encamp	Encamp	AD-03	74	29	7,119	10,595	14,029	10,857	11,688	157.9
Coat of arms of Escaldes-Engordany	Escaldes-Engordany	AD-08	47	18	12,235	15,299	16,475	13,873	14,599	310.6
Coat of arms of La Massana	La Massana	AD-04	65	25	3,868	6,276	9,357	9,096	10,174	156.5
Coat of arms of Ordino	Ordino	AD-05	89	34	1,289	2,283	3,685	4,429	4,942	55.5
Coat of arms of San Julián de Loria	Sant Julià de Lòria	AD-06	60	23	6,012	7,623	9,595	8,681	9,375	156.3
Coat of arms of Andorra	Andorra	AD	468	181	50,835	65,971	83,137	71,732	77,543	165.7

== See also ==
- ISO 3166-2:AD
- List of cities in Andorra
