= Borders of Andorra =

Andorra has 118 km (73 mi) of borders, bordering Spain and France.

== Borders ==
=== Andorra-France border ===
The Andorran border with France is 57 kilometres long, and extends through the north and east of the country.

=== Andorra-Spain border ===
The Andorran border with Spain is 64 kilometres long, and extends through the south and west of the country.

== Crossing points ==
Location	Road or Facility
Border with France
(Andorra) El Pas de la Casa (Encamp)- (France) Porté-Puymorens	D'Envalira Tunnel
(Andorra) El Pas de la Casa (Encamp)- (France) Porté-Puymorens	CG-2 - N22
Border with Spain
(Andorra) Juberri (Sant Julià de Lòria)- (Spain) La Farga de Moles (Les Valls de Valira)	CG-1 - N-145
(Andorra) Fontaneda (Sant Julià de Lòria)- (Spain) Civís (Les Valls de Valira)	Rural track
(Andorra) Bixessarri (Sant Julià de Lòria)- (Spain) Os de Civís (Les Valls de Valira)	CG-6 - Carrer Sant Julià
(Andorra) Pal (La Massana)- (Spain) Tor (Alins)	CG-4 - Tor Road
