= Església de Sant Esteve de Bixessarri =

Church in Bixessarri, Andorra

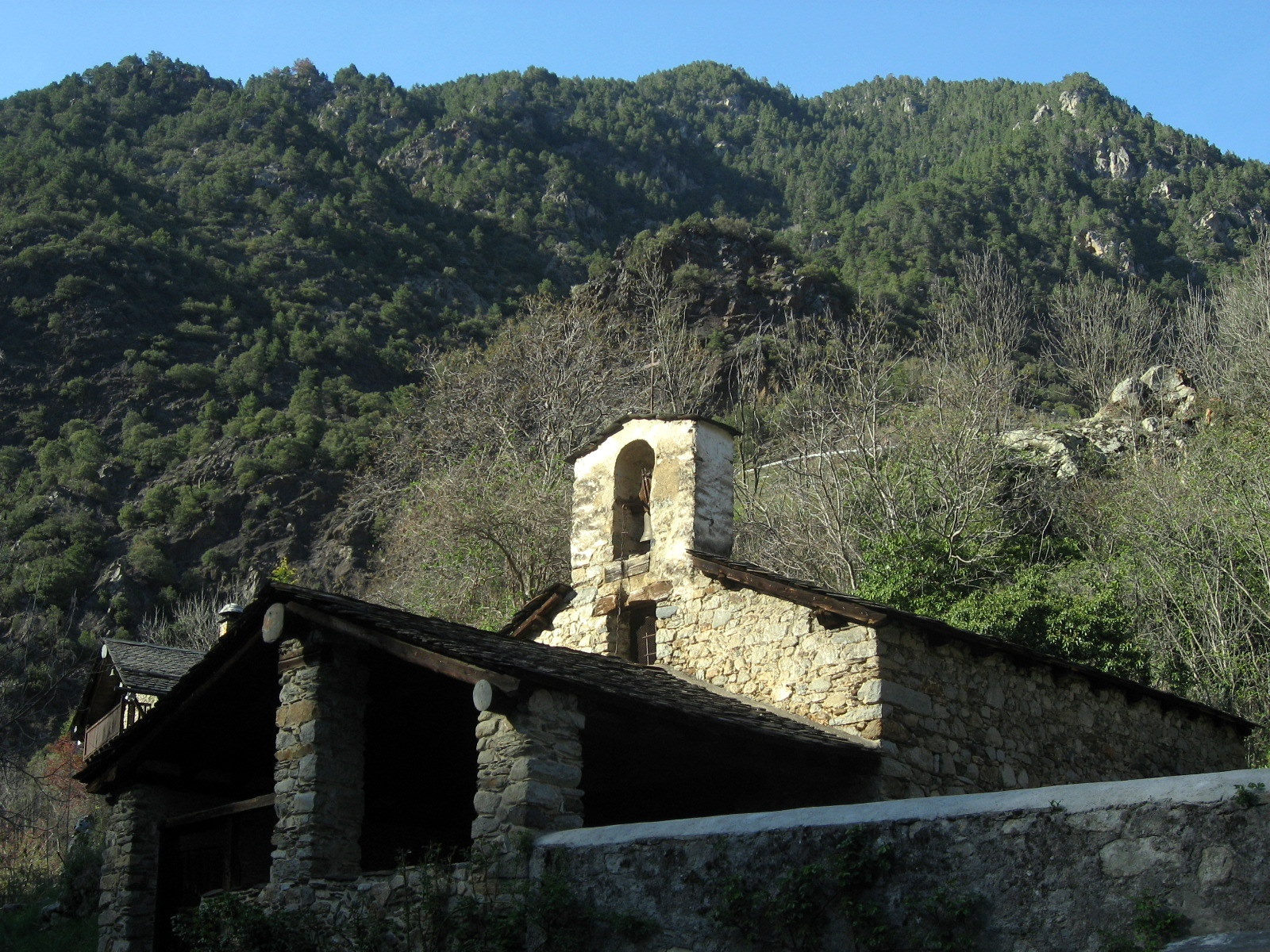
- Església de Sant Esteve de Bixessarri
- 42.4826°N 1.4588°E
- Location: Bixessarri, Sant Julià de Lòria, Andorra
- Country: Andorra
- Denomination: Catholic Church
- Sui iuris church: Latin Church

Architecture
- Architectural type: Baroque architecture
- Completed: 1701

Església de Sant Esteve de Bixessarri is a church located in Bixessarri, Sant Julià de Lòria, Andorra, that was constructed in 1701, using Baroque architecture. The church that existed in Bixessarri before Església de Sant Esteve de Bixessarri is believed to have been in ruins at the time of its construction. The Cultural Heritage of Andorra registered the church as an asset of cultural interest on 16 July 2003, and preservation work was done for the site in 2022.

== History ==
Església de Sant Esteve de Bixessarri is located in the town of Bixessarri, in the parish of Sant Julià de Lòria. Construction of the church was completed in 1701. There is no documented mention of a church Bixessarri prior to the construction of Església de Sant Esteve de Bixessarri. The Gran Enciclopèdia Catalana states that it is possible that the previous church was in ruins before the construction of the new church.

The Cultural Heritage of Andorra listed the church as an asset of cultural interest on 16 July 2003. The church area was delimited by the Andorran Ministry of Culture in 2012. In 2022, €8,254.44 were awarded for preventive maintenance and conservation of thirteen properties listed as assets of cultural interests, including Església de Sant Esteve de Bixessarri.

== Structure ==
Built using Baroque architecture, the church uses a rectangular plan with a gable roof and does not have an apse. There are four windows that are believed to be from different architectural periods. The Baroque altarpiece is dedicated to Saint Stephen. The entirety of the nave has been whitewashed. There is a bell tower on the western façade.

== Works cited ==
=== News ===
- "Concurs per definir l'entorn de protecció de Meritxell i Sant Romà de les Bons". Bondia. 11 July 2012. Archived from the original on 29 April 2025.
- "Patrimoni Cultural adjudica el cobriment de pissarra de tretze esglésies". Ara. 9 July 2022. Archived from the original on 19 July 2024.

=== Web ===
- "Església de Sant Esteve de Bixessarri". Cultural Heritage of Andorra. Archived from the original on 2 May 2012.
- "Sant Esteve de Bixessarri (Sant Julià de Lòria)". Gran Enciclopèdia Catalana. Archived from the original on 29 April 2025.
