= CG-1 =

Road in Andorra

Main Road CG1
- Carretera general 1

Route information
- Length: 12 km (7.5 mi)

Major junctions
- From: La Farga de Moles, N-145
- To: Encamp, CG-2

Location
- Country: Andorra

Highway system
- Transport in Andorra

CG-1 (Carretera General 1) is a road of the Andorra Road Network that connects the capital, Andorra la Vella with La Seu d'Urgell to Alt Urgell. The workers of FHASA contributed to its construction. It is also called Carretera d'Espanya.

== History ==
Financed by a tax on wheat and flour imports, the road was inaugurated by co-prince Juan Benlloch y Vivó and opened to automobile traffic in 1913.
