= Església de Sant Miquel de Fontaneda =

Church in Sant Julià de Lòria, Andorra

Coordinates: 42°27′16″N 1°27′49″E

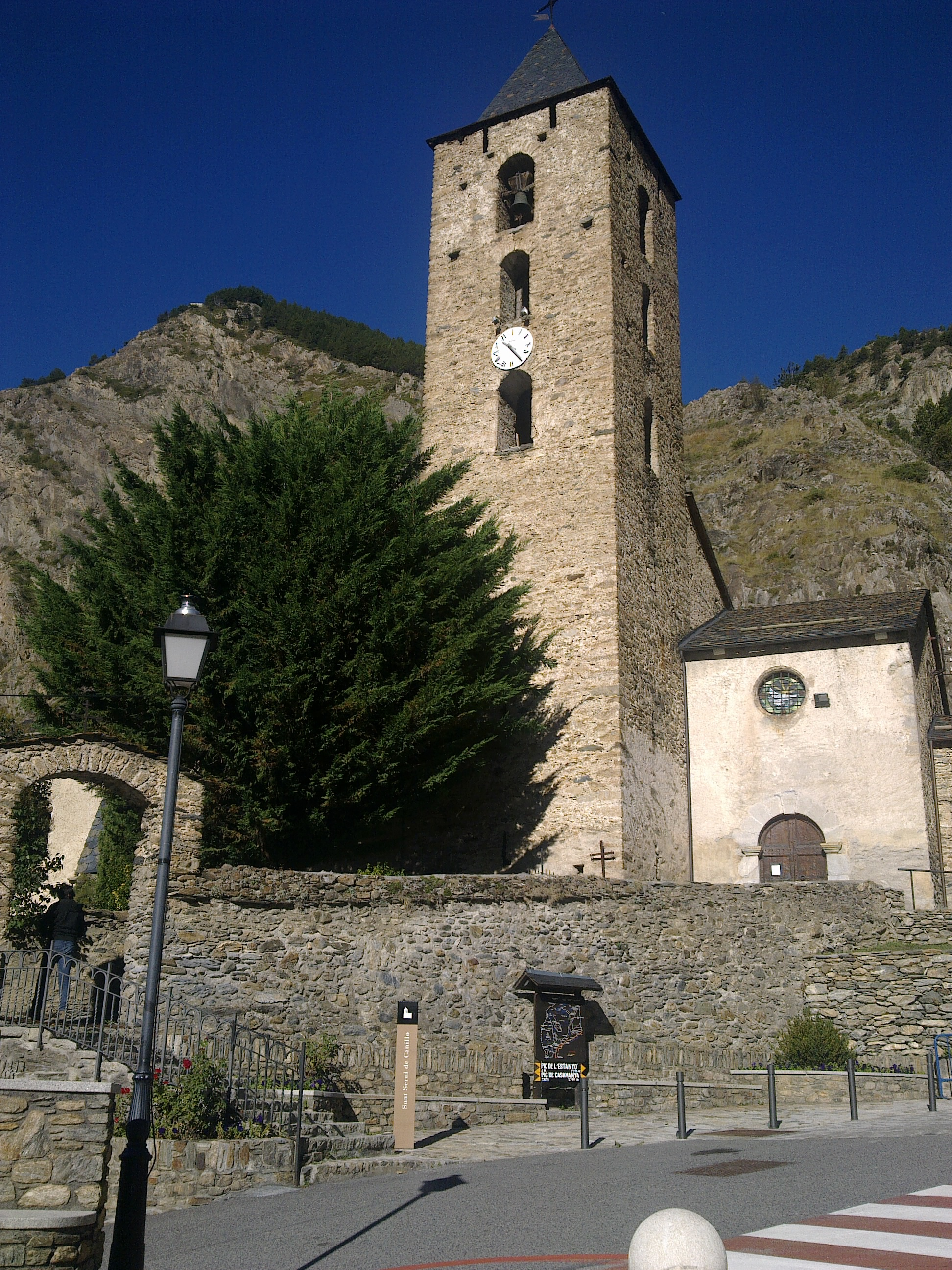
Església de Sant Miquel de Fontaneda

Església de Sant Miquel de Fontaneda is a church located in Fontaneda, Sant Julià de Lòria Parish, Andorra. It is a heritage property registered in the Cultural Heritage of Andorra. It was built in the 11-12th century.
