= Jordi Peñarroja =

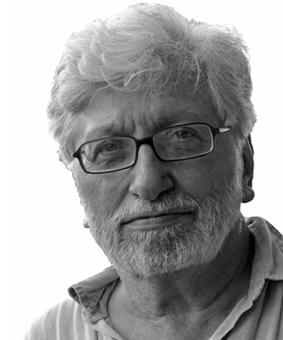

Jordi-Vicenç Peñarroja Villanueva (born January 17, 1944), whose pseudonym is "Jordi Peñarroja" is a writer from Barceleona. He is a member of the Catalan History Circle and the Association of Writers in the Catalan Language. He collaborates with Memorial 1714.

== Work ==
- Design and editing of five exhibitions for the Memorial 1714, between 1997 and 2008.
- Awarded the "“Premi de la Crítica Serra d'Or 1981”" as illustrator of Canela's work. La fantasia inacabable d'Antoni Gaudí.
- The Eleventh of September 1976 was one of the cameras in the documentary film "Una altra albada", about the concentration in Sant Boi de Llobregat..
- Author of the article "Photography" in the Gran Enciclopèdia Catalana (1974)
- Has published numerous graphic and/or literary collaborations in various media and by some publishing houses.

== Historical essays ==
- 1700, Viure en temps de guerra. 1. Blat i pa. Calonge: QU editor, 2021.
- Indis i negres catalans. De Santes Creus a Santo Domingo. Barcelona: Llibres de l'Índex, 2014. ISBN 9788494233425.
- Barcelona 1713, capital d'un Estat. Barcelona: Llibres de l'índex, 2013. ISBN 9788494133848.
- Pessebre vivent independentista d'Arenys de Munt. Barcelona: Llibres de l'Índex, 2012. ISBN 9788494071201.
- Ictineus. Barcelona: Llibres de l'Índex, 2010. ISBN 9788496563872.
- Barcelona: sentir l'Onze de Setembre. Vol. 1. Barcelona: Llibres de l'Índex, 2007. ISBN 9788496563551.
- Edificis viatgers de Barcelona. Barcelona: Llibres de l'Índex, 2007. ISBN 9788496563261.
- Aventures, invents i navegacions d'en Narcís Monturiol. Barcelona: Blume, 1980. ISBN 9788496563872.

=== Narrative ===
- “Villarroel 231: cas obert”, black genre narrative included in the collection "Clio assassina". Barcelona: Llibres de l'Index, 2013. ISBN 9788494071232.
- “Aquella pell tan bruna”, black genre narrative included in the collection: "Un riu de crims". Barcelona: March editor, 2010. ISBN 9788496638860.
- El jardí de les tortugues. Barcelona: Llibres de l'Índex, 2008. ISBN 9788496563674.
- El President a París. Barcelona: Llibres de l'Índex, 2007. ISBN 9788496563476.
- La Pàtria Sepulcral, novel·la de seny i disseny. Barcelona: El clavell, 1997. ISBN 8492099984.

=== Other ===
- La fantasia inacabable d'Antoni Gaudí. Barcelona: Blume, 1980. ISBN 9788470312397.
- Three chapters of "Museus singulars de Catalunya" (Diàfora, 1979).

== Other websites ==
- "Worldcat". Jordi Peñarroja (in Spanish).
