= Andorra–Spain border =

International border

- The border, as seen on the map

Characteristics
- Entities: Andorra Spain
- Length: 64 km (40 mi)

The border between Andorra and Spain is in the Pyrenees between northern Spain and southern and western Andorra. It is 64 kilometres (40 mi) long. It is an external border of the EU, as well as an external border of the Schengen area, as Andorra is neither part of the EU nor a party to the Schengen agreement.

== Specifications ==
The Spanish-Andorran border runs 64 km (40 mi) between the south of Andorra and northern Spain (by the autonomous community of Catalonia) in the Pyrenees Mountains. Because both Spain and Andorra are situated in the same watershed, travel is easier (roads are better) than travel between Andorra and France. The sole official language of Andorra is Catalan.

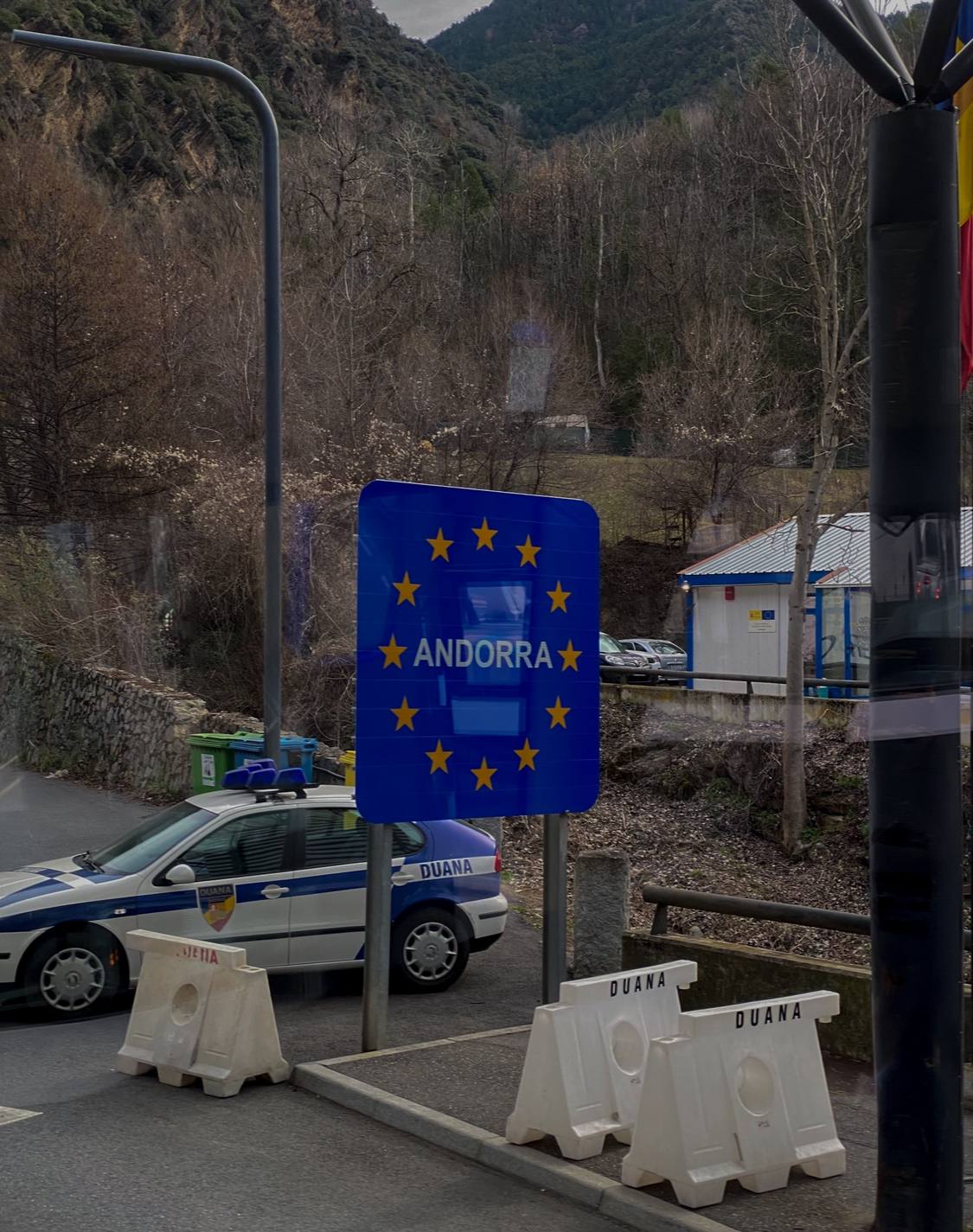
Sign at the Andorra-Spain border.

The border begins in the west at the Andorra-France-Spain tripoint (42°36′13″N 1°26′30″W). It then follows a generally south-eastern direction, later turning northeast to the eastern Andorra-Spain-France tripoint (42°30′09″N 1°43′34″W). The dividing line between the two countries goes through high mountain areas, often over 2,000 metres (6,600 ft), and passes close to the highest point of Andorra, the peak of Coma Pedrosa. It also borders the Madriu-Perafita-Claror Valley, the only UNESCO World Heritage Site in Andorra.

In May 2015 the European commission adopted a cooperation program to improve the protection of the environment at the Spain-Andorra and Andorra-France borders.

The border point at Os de Civís (Spain) can only be accessed by Sant Julià de Lòria in Andorra.

== Border controls ==
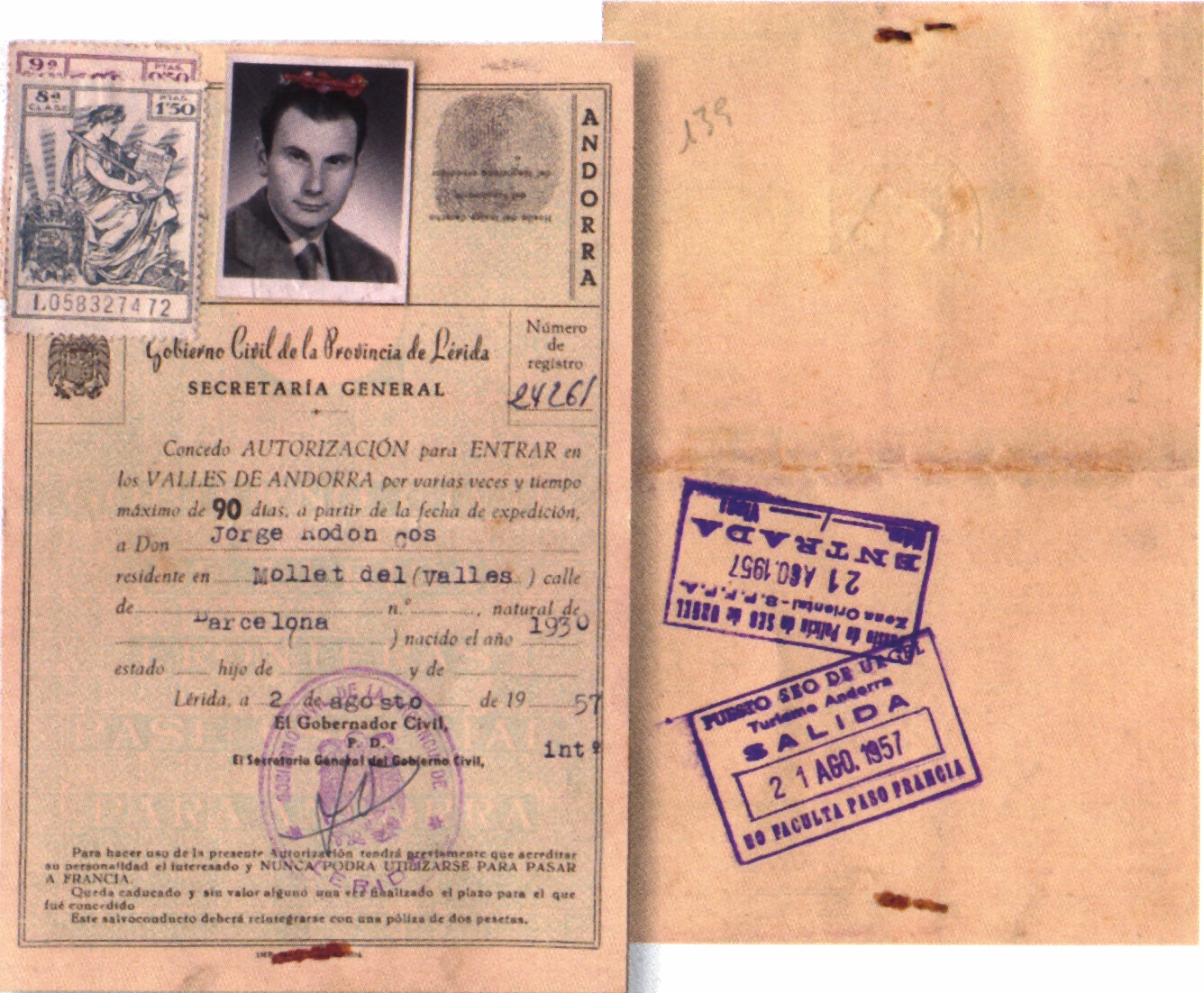
Entry permit for a Spaniard, issued in Lleida, 1957

The main channel of communication between the two countries is through the Valira Valley between La Seu d'Urgell and the parish of Sant Julià de Lòria. The only border control at the Andorra–Spain border is located along this road. There is no rail crossing point.

In addition, helicopters are allowed to go to airports with border control in other countries, but not to anywhere else outside Andorra. Flights usually go to the airports of Barcelona or Toulouse.

An agreement signed in 2003 between France, Spain and Andorra governs the movement and residence in Andorra of citizens of third states. It says that the three countries will coordinate their visa requirements, although in reality today Andorra follows the Schengen Agreement visa requirements, and that Andorra will only allow entry of those who have right of entry to Spain or France. Andorra is allowed to permit residency to any person and such persons will be treated as long-term residents of France or Spain.

== Contraband ==
Due to the low tax on tobacco in Andorra there is significant cigarette smuggling between the two countries; it takes place through the border post of La Farga de Molas but also often through the mountain passes. The Guardia Civil is responsible for surveillance at the border and arrests smugglers on the Spanish side.

== See also ==
- Andorra–France border
- France–Spain border
