= Civis =

Civis or CIVIS may refer to:

- civis, the Latin word for a (Roman) citizen
- Civís, a village in Spain
- Civis Media Prize
- Communauté intercommunale des Villes solidaires (CIVIS), an administrative structure in Réunion
- CIVIS, a type of train service on the Spanish Cercanías lines (for example on Cercanías Madrid)
- Irisbus Civis, a model of trolleybus produced by Iveco Bus
- Civis (pen name), the nom de plume of Thomas W. Cardozo
