= Església de Sant Pere d'Aixirivall =

Church in Aixirivall, Andorra

Coordinates: 42°27′46″N 1°30′07″E

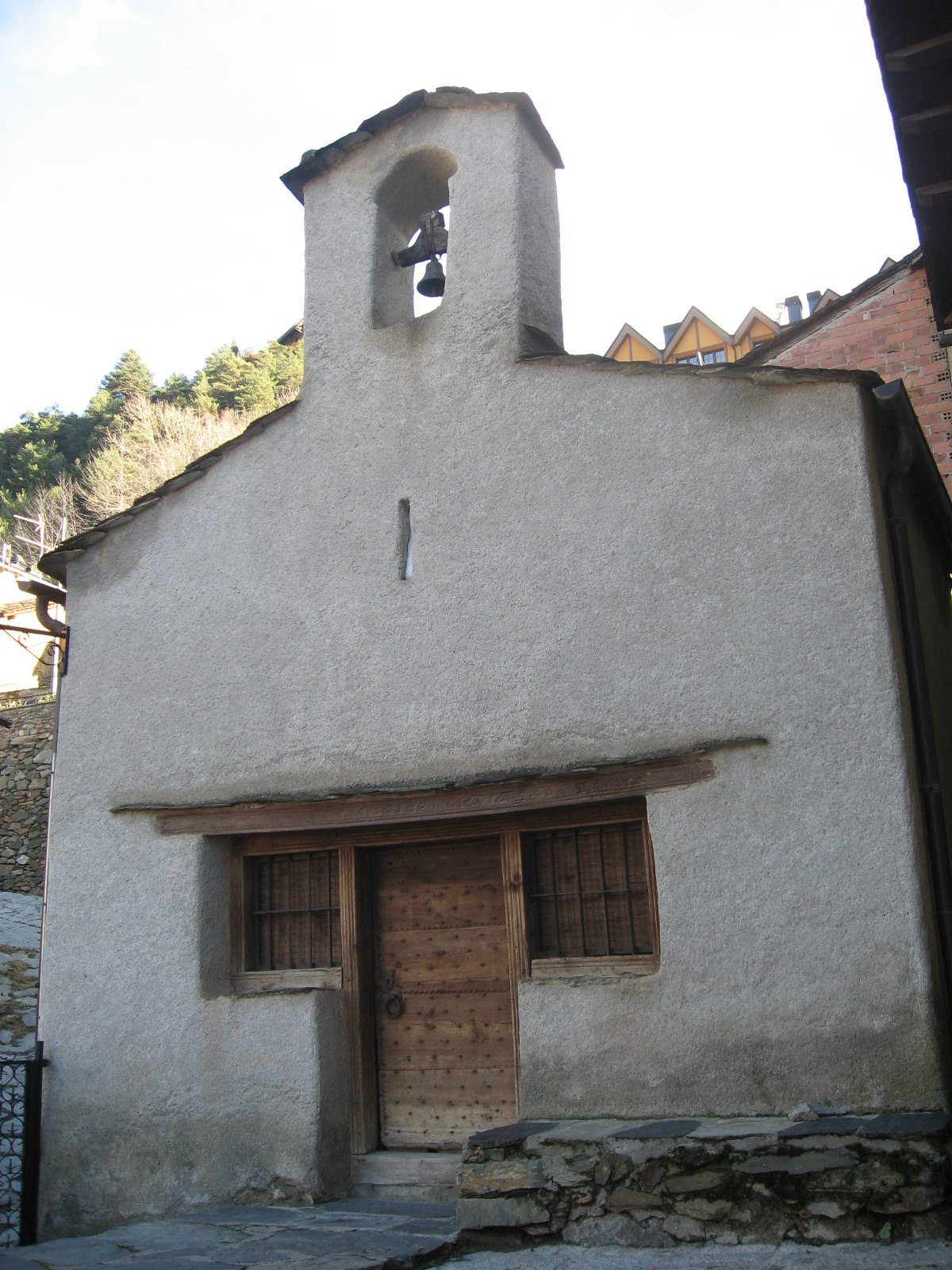
Església de Sant Pere d'Aixirivall

Església de Sant Pere d'Aixirivall is a church located in Aixirivall, Sant Julià de Lòria Parish, Andorra. It is a heritage property registered in the Cultural Heritage of Andorra. It was built in 1603.
