= Aixirivall =

Village in Sant Julià de Lòria, Andorra

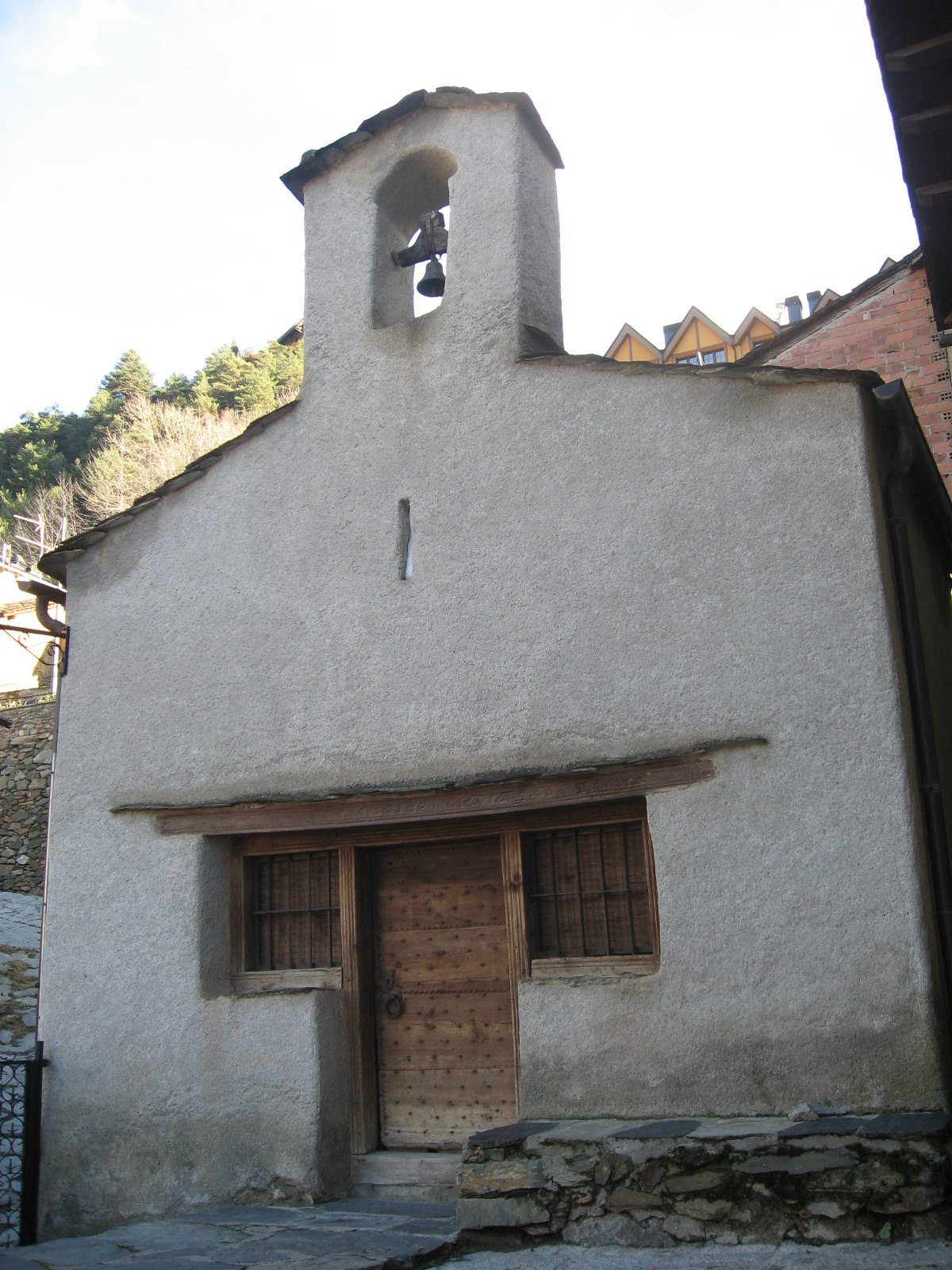
- Church of Sant Pere d'Aixirivall

- Location in Andorra
- Coordinates: 42°28′N 1°30′E
- Country: Andorra
- Parish: Sant Julià de Lòria
- Elevation: 1,356 m (4,449 ft)

Population (2023)
  - Total: 1,041

Aixirivall (Catalan pronunciation: [ajʃiɾiˈβaʎ]) is a village in the parish of Sant Julià de Lòria, Andorra. First mentioned in 1176, the village is host to the Romanesque church Església de Sant Pere d'Aixirivall and an ethnology collection with over 1,000 objects. Beautification campaigns in the 2020s resulted in the roads being paved and roads leading to the village being stabilized.

== Geography ==
Aixirivall is located within the parish of Sant Julià de Lòria, in the country of Andorra. It is 1,148 meters above sea level and the Gran Valira flows nearby.

== History ==
The first documented mention of Aixirivall was in 1176. The Romanesque church Església de Sant Pere d'Aixirivall is located within the village. An ethnology collection was installed in the village in 1957, and grew to hold over 1,000 objects before being moved into the town hall at a cost of €150,000 in 2021.

€123,255 were spent on paving the roads in Aixirivall as part of a beautification campaign in 2022. €208,255 were spent to stabilize the roads leading to Aixirivall in 2022. The drinking water tanks in the village will be connected to those in the town of Sant Julià de Lòria by 2027.

== Demographics ==
The population of the village rose from 776 in 2010, to 1,064 in 2024.

== Transportation ==
A section of the CG-1 main road passes through the village. 14,184 passengers were recorded on the bus trips to Aixirivall in 2012. As of 2023, the area's bus service is done by Andbus and contracted through the Sant Julià de Lòria parish.

== Works cited ==
=== News ===
- "El transport públic de les parròquies registra un augment d'usuaris el 2012". Bondia. 10 March 2013. Archived from the original on 27 April 2025.
- "Els dipòsits d'aigua d'Auvinyà a Aixirivall, interconnectats el 2027". Bondia. 16 March 2025. Archived from the original on 28 April 2025.
- "Més de 206.000 euros per embellir els cascs antics d'Aixovall i Aixirivall". Altaveu. 20 July 2022. Archived from the original on 16 February 2025.
- "Reunió amb els veïns de la part alta del poble per explicar les obres a l'enllaç d'Aixovall". Bondia. 25 February 2021. Archived from the original on 28 April 2025.
- "Sant Julià de Lòria adjudica el servei del Quart Bus per més de 220.000 euros". Bondia. 21 June 2023. Archived from the original on 27 April 2025.
- "Sergi Mas, per començar". Bondia. 25 August 2021. Archived from the original on 28 April 2025.
- Solanelles, Toni (22 July 2023). "Sant Julià ha de destinar 200.000 euros més per estabilitzar la carretera a Aixirivall". Altaveu. Archived from the original on 28 April 2025.

=== Web ===
- "Aixirivall". Gran Enciclopèdia Catalana. Archived from the original on 28 April 2025.
- "Statistic and Data". Andorra.
