= Certers =

Village in Sant Julià de Lòria, Andorra

- Location in Andorra
- Coordinates: 42°28′31″N 1°30′21″E
- Country: Andorra
- Parish: Sant Julià de Lòria
- Highest elevation: 1,440 m (4,720 ft)
- Lowest elevation: 1,250 m (4,100 ft)

Population (2012)
  - Total: 73

Certers (Catalan pronunciation: [seɾˈtes]) is a village in Andorra, located in the parish of Sant Julià de Lòria.
