= CG-2 =

Road in Andorra

Main Road CG2
- Carretera general 2

Route information
- Length: 33 km (21 mi)

Major junctions
- From: Encamp, CG-1
- To: El Pas de la Casa, N22

Location
- Country: Andorra

Highway system
- Transport in Andorra

CG-2 (Carretera General 2) is a road of the Andorra Road Network that connects Escaldes-Engordany to the border with France.

This road starts at the Encamp roundabout, CG-1 and ends at the Dos Valires Tunnel in the French border (N22). It is also called Carretera de França.
