= Juberri =

- Village
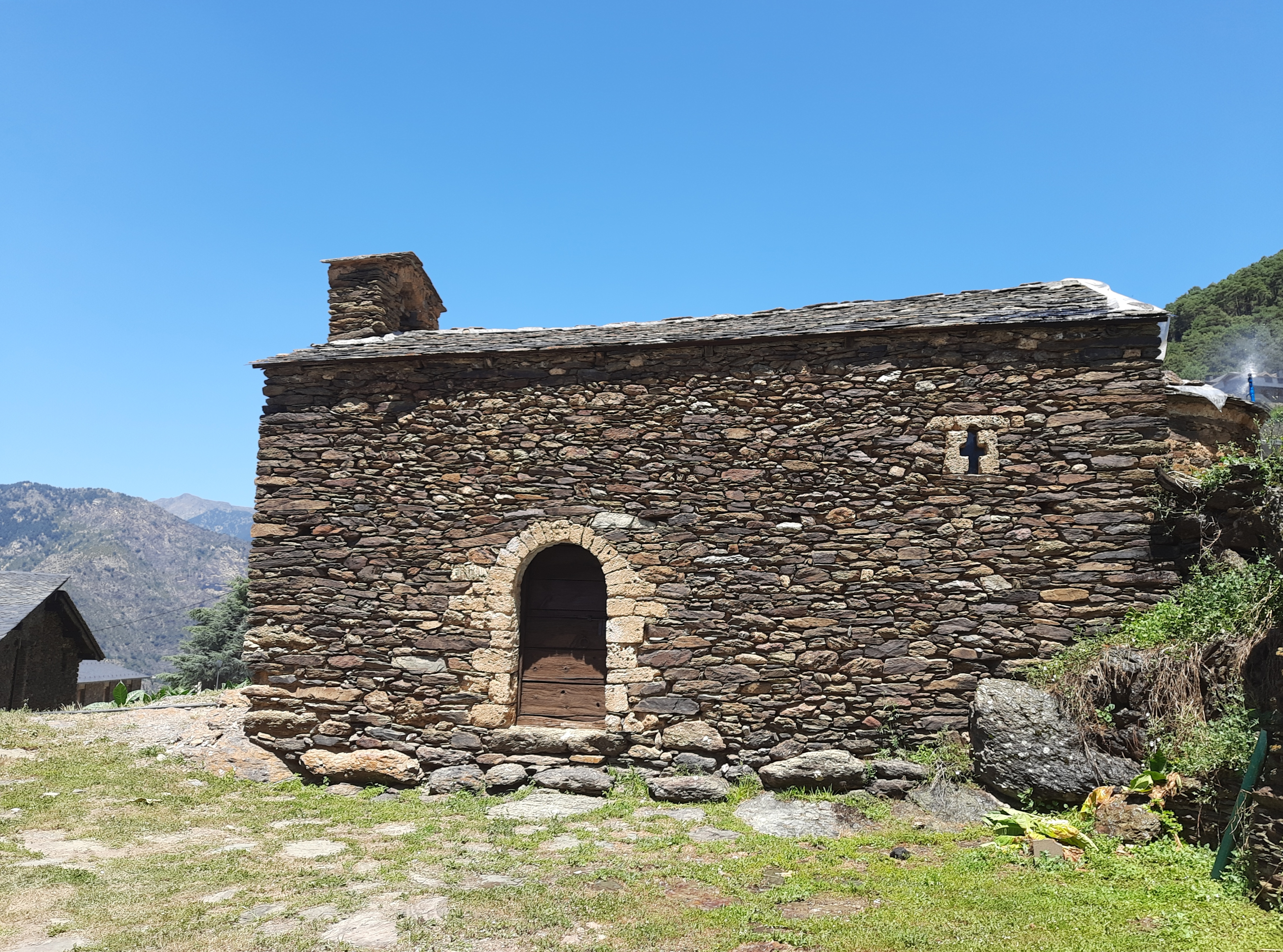
- Church of Sant Esteve

- Location in Andorra
- Coordinates: 42°26′20″N 1°29′31″E
- Country: Andorra
- Parish: Sant Julià de Lòria
- Elevation: 1,803 m (5,915 ft)

Population (2010)
  - Total: 183

Juberri or Juverri (Catalan pronunciation: [ʒuˈβɛri]) is a village in the parish of Sant Julià de Lòria, Andorra, close to the border with Spain. The area has a large tobacco industry and a Neolithic site is nearby.

== Geography ==
Juberi is located within the parish of Sant Julià de Lòria, in the country of Andorra. It is close to the country's border with Spain, and is at an altitude of 1,281 meters. The Gran Valira flows nearby.

== History ==
Neolithic archaeological excavations have been made in Juberri since the discovery of artifacts on private property in 1983. A Neolithic site in the area, Feixa del Moro site, dates to between 4,500–3,956 BC. The site features three burials, with one being robbed before its recent discovery.

On 11 October 1937, around 400 people tried to flee Francoist Spain to Andorra through Juberri, but only 115–130 were successful; the remainder were killed or captured.

The church in Juberri, Sant Esteve de Juberri, was used for the curing of tobacco in the 20th century. A family in Juberri managed a tobacco smuggling business until the police arrested them in 2016, and a total of €400,000 in fines were imposed on the family. In 2018, 11 people were arrested in the mountains near Juberri with €21,402 worth of tobacco that they were smuggling.

== Transportation ==
5,857 bus trips were recorded in Juberri in 2012. As of 2023, the area's bus service is done by Andbus and contracted through the Sant Julià de Lòria parish.

== Works cited ==
=== News ===
- "1937: Baulard compta morts". Bondia. 16 January 2018. Archived from the original on 27 April 2025.
- "El jaciment neolític de Juberri data d'entre els anys 4500 i 3956 abans de Crist". Altaveu. 20 April 2017. Archived from the original on 27 April 2025.
- "El transport públic de les parròquies registra un augment d'usuaris el 2012". Bondia. 10 March 2013. Archived from the original on 27 April 2025.
- "Enxampat a Juberri un grup d'onze persones de l'Europa de l'est que passava tabac per la muntanya". Altaveu. 2 September 2021. Archived from the original on 27 April 2025.
- "La vida dels andorrans, fa 5.000 anys". Ara. 6 April 2016. Archived from the original on 27 April 2025.
- "Sant Julià de Lòria adjudica el servei del Quart Bus per més de 220.000 euros". Bondia. 21 June 2023. Archived from the original on 27 April 2025.
- Cortes, Cristian (26 February 2021). "La justícia comissa el xalet de la família de Juberri que traficava amb tabac". Altaveu. Archived from the original on 27 April 2025.
- Perez, Gabriel (9 February 2024). "Quan el tabac s'assecava a (gairebé) tot arreu". Altaveu. Archived from the original on 27 April 2025.

=== Web ===
- "Juverri". Gran Enciclopèdia Catalana. Archived from the original on 27 April 2025.
