= Llumeneres =

Village in Sant Julià de Lòria, Andorra

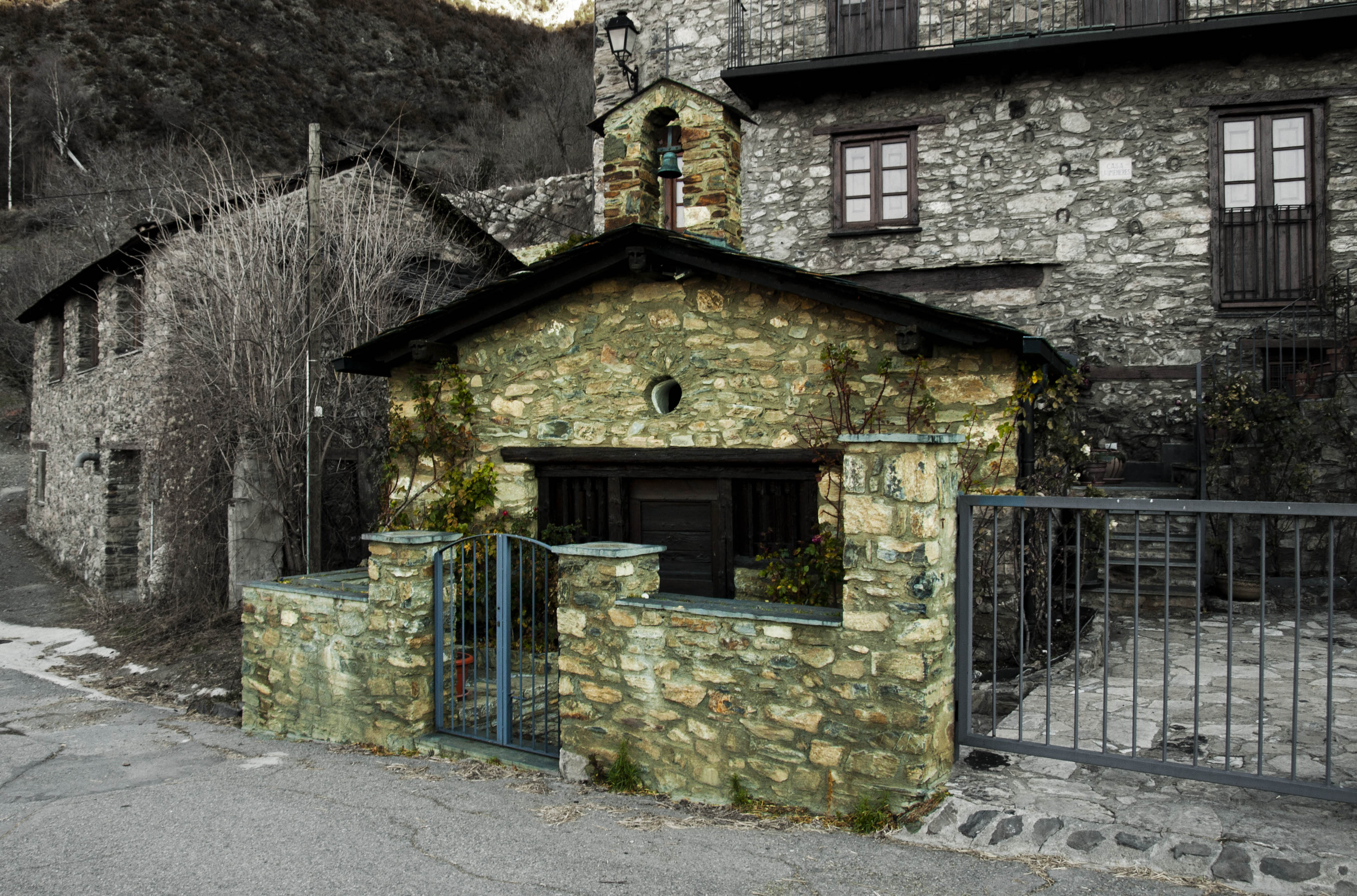
- Chapel of Mare de Déu de les Neus de Llumeneres

- Location in Andorra
- Coordinates: 42°28′21″N 1°30′40″E
- Country: Andorra
- Parish: Sant Julià de Lòria
- Elevation: 1,819 m (5,968 ft)

Population (2016)
  - Total: 3

Llumeneres (Catalan pronunciation: [ʎumeˈneɾes]) is a village in Andorra, located in the parish of Sant Julià de Lòria. It is known for its church, the Chapel of Mare de Déu de les Neus de Llumeneres. In 2016, it had a population of only 3 people.

== Etymology ==
The origin of the name Llumeneres is uncertain. The earliest mention of the village is in 1048, when it was spelled Almuneres. Catalan philologist Enric Moreu-Rey suggests it may be derived from the Arabic word for watchtower, while Catalan linguist Joan Coromines proposes that the name may be of Latin origin, derived from the word liminaria, the plural form of liminare, meaning "threshold" or "entrance gate". Coromines believes the name could be a reference to the village being the entrance to the municipality of Santa Coloma de Farners or to the valley of Santa Creu d'Horta, as the hill of Llumeneres historically marked the limit of the Guilleries.

== Geography ==
Llumeneres is also the name of a hill near the village. The hill is located 794 metres (2,605 ft) above sea level on the municipal boundary between Osor and Santa Coloma de Farners, to the southeast of the municipality.

== Demographics ==
The population of Llumeneres was 3 in 2016. The village only had one resident before 2014.

== Culture ==
The most significant building in the village is its church, the Chapel of Mare de Déu de les Neus de Llumeneres. It was built in the traditional Andorran fashion, with walls made of stone connected by mud and covered in lime mortar, capped by a wooden roof and a two-sided stone slab. The interior contains pictures with wooden frames engraved with Latin liturgical texts, as well as sculptures of Our Lady Mare de Déu de les Neus and St. Pere. The original documentation that granted the church its licence in 1769, which bears the dry stamp of bishop Francisco Fernández de Xátiva, has been preserved by the family who owns the church.
