= Aubinyà =

Village in Sant Julià de Lòria, Andorra

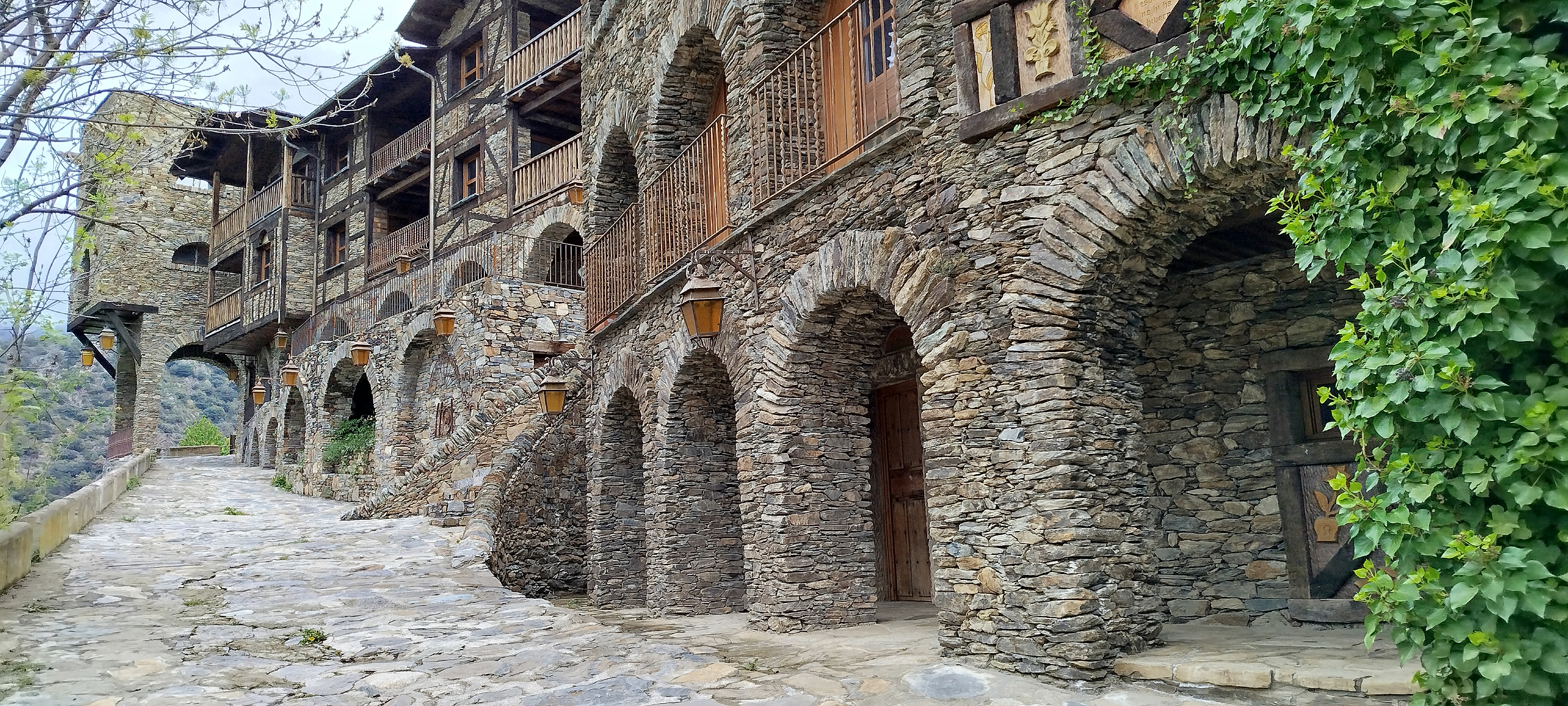

- Location in Andorra
- Coordinates: 42°27.17′N 1°29.58′E
- Country: Andorra
- Parish: Sant Julià de Lòria
- Highest elevation: 1,360 m (4,460 ft)
- Lowest elevation: 1,140 m (3,740 ft)

Population (2012)
  - Total: 238

Aubinyà (Catalan pronunciation: [awβiˈɲa]), also named Auvinyà (and Albinyà in the past), is a village in Andorra, in the parish of Sant Julià de Lòria.

The Sant Romà d'Aubinyà church is located here.
