= Dos Valires Tunnel =

- Interactive map of Dos Valires Tunnel

Overview
- Location: La Massana, Encamp, Andorra / Escaldes-Engordany, Escaldes-Engordany, Andorra
- Coordinates: 42°31′2.643″N 1°33′20.142″E
- Route: CG-2 / CG-3

Operation
- Work began: 2005
- Opened: 2012
- Character: Dual-tube

Technical
- Length: 2,922 m (9,587 ft)
- No. of lanes: 4
- Operating speed: 80 km/h (50 mph)

The Dos Valires Tunnel (Tunel de les Dos Valires) is a major road tunnel in Andorra linking the two upper Andorran parishes of La Massana and Encamp. It is 2.922 kilometres (1.816 mi) long. The tunnel connects Generals Roads 2 and 3 linking the Valira del Nord (North Valley) and the Valira d'Orient (East Valley). It is the first stage of the northern bypass of Andorra la Vella/Escaldes-Engordany.

== History ==
The construction of the tunnel was started in 2005 but was halted in 2009 after one of the viaducts at the La Massana entrance collapsed and killed 5 Portuguese construction workers. The tunnel cost over €160 million to build and it is estimated that 2500 vehicles per day will use the tunnel.

Authorization for bicycle circulation inside the tunnel

Mobilitat authorizes the passage of bicycles in both directions of the Dos Valires tunnel from 2022. The executive reminds that cyclists will have to wear position lighting in front of white and behind in red, as well as reflective elements.

In order to reinforce the safety of cyclists, Mobilitat is painting the first 200 meters of the cycle lane green that has been reserved for bicycles within the infrastructure. In addition, external signage will be reinforced to remind vehicles of their traffic.
