= Aixàs =

- Village
- Location in Andorra
- Coordinates: 42°29′11″N 1°28′2″E
- Country: Andorra
- Parish: Sant Julià de Lòria
- Highest elevation: 1,500 m (4,900 ft)
- Lowest elevation: 1,480 m (4,860 ft)

Aixàs (Catalan pronunciation: [ajˈʃas]) is a place in south-west Andorra. It belongs to the parish of Sant Julià de Lòria. To its west are Civís and Os de Civís in Spain, to its north Xixerella, to its east Santa Coloma, and to its south Aixovall.
