= Os de Civís =

- Village
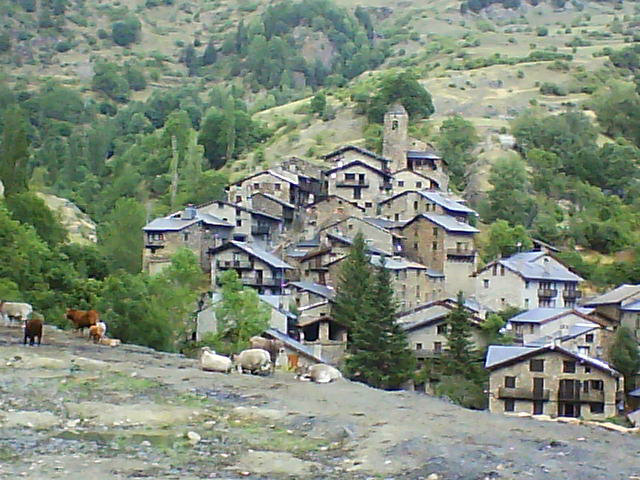
- View towards Os de Civís

- Location in Spain Os de Civís (Catalonia) Os de Civís (Spain)
- Coordinates: 42°30′N 1°26′E
- Country: Spain
- Autonomous community: Catalonia
- Province: Lleida
- County: Alt Urgell
- Municipality: Les Valls de Valira
- Elevation: 2,150 m (7,050 ft)

Population (2005)
  - Total: 104

Os de Civís (Catalan pronunciation: [ˌoz ðə siˈβis]) is a village in the central Pyrenees mountains, in the municipality of Les Valls de Valira in Catalonia, Spain, and is located to the west of Andorra, near the villages of Aixàs and Bixessarri. Civís is the nearest Spanish village. It is the most populated village in the municipality.

Os de Civís is very close to the Spain–Andorra border, and is unique in being the only Spanish village that can be reached by vehicle only by going through Andorra. The border crossing is unique in Andorra in that there is no border control: Andorra is in neither the Schengen Area nor the European Union, and thus operates full border and customs checks at all other border crossings with Spain and France, but the crossing to Os de Civís is unpoliced as the road leads solely to the village, with no access to anywhere else in Spain. The village has a number of medieval buildings, including a Romanesque church.
