= Nagol =

Village in Sant Julià de Lòria, Andorra

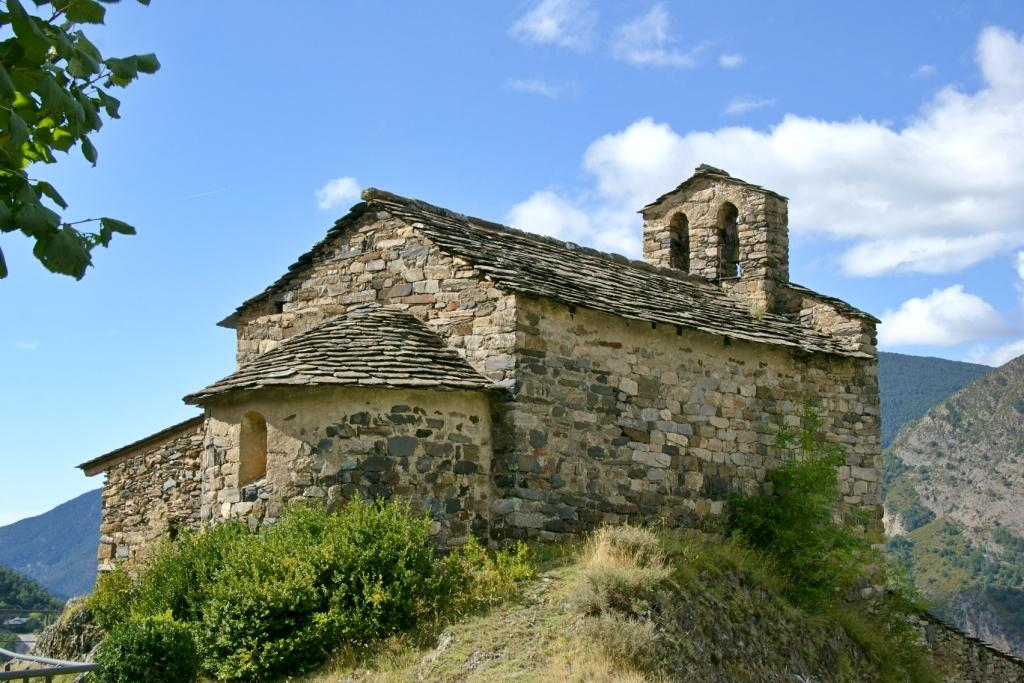
- Església de Sant Serni de Nagol.

- Location in Andorra
- Coordinates: 42°28′16″N 1°30′12″E
- Country: Andorra
- Parish: Sant Julià de Lòria
- Highest elevation: 1,200 m (3,900 ft)
- Lowest elevation: 1,020 m (3,350 ft)

Population (2012)
  - Total: 63

Nagol (Catalan pronunciation: [naˈɣɔl]; formerly Nagual) is a village in Andorra, located in the parish of Sant Julià de Lòria.
