= Civís =

- Village
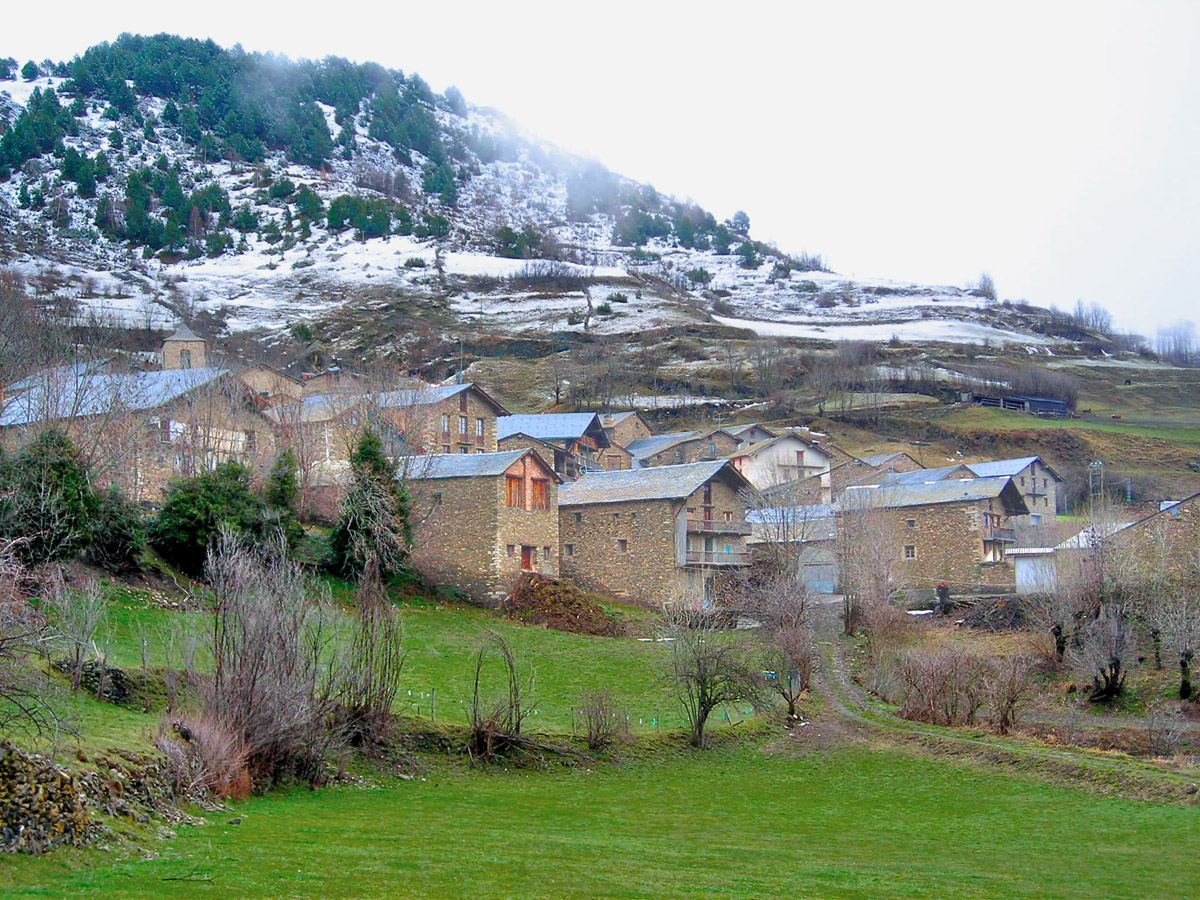
- Civís

- Location in Catalonia Civís (Catalonia) Civís (Spain)
- Coordinates: 42°28′N 1°25′E
- Country: Spain
- Autonomous community: Catalonia
- Province: Lleida
- County: Alt Urgell
- Municipality: Les Valls de Valira

Population (2005)
  - Total: 44

Civís is a village in the municipality of Les Valls de Valira, in Catalonia, Spain, located to the west of Aixàs and Bixessarri (Andorra) and near Os de Civís.
