= Les Valls de Valira =

- Municipality
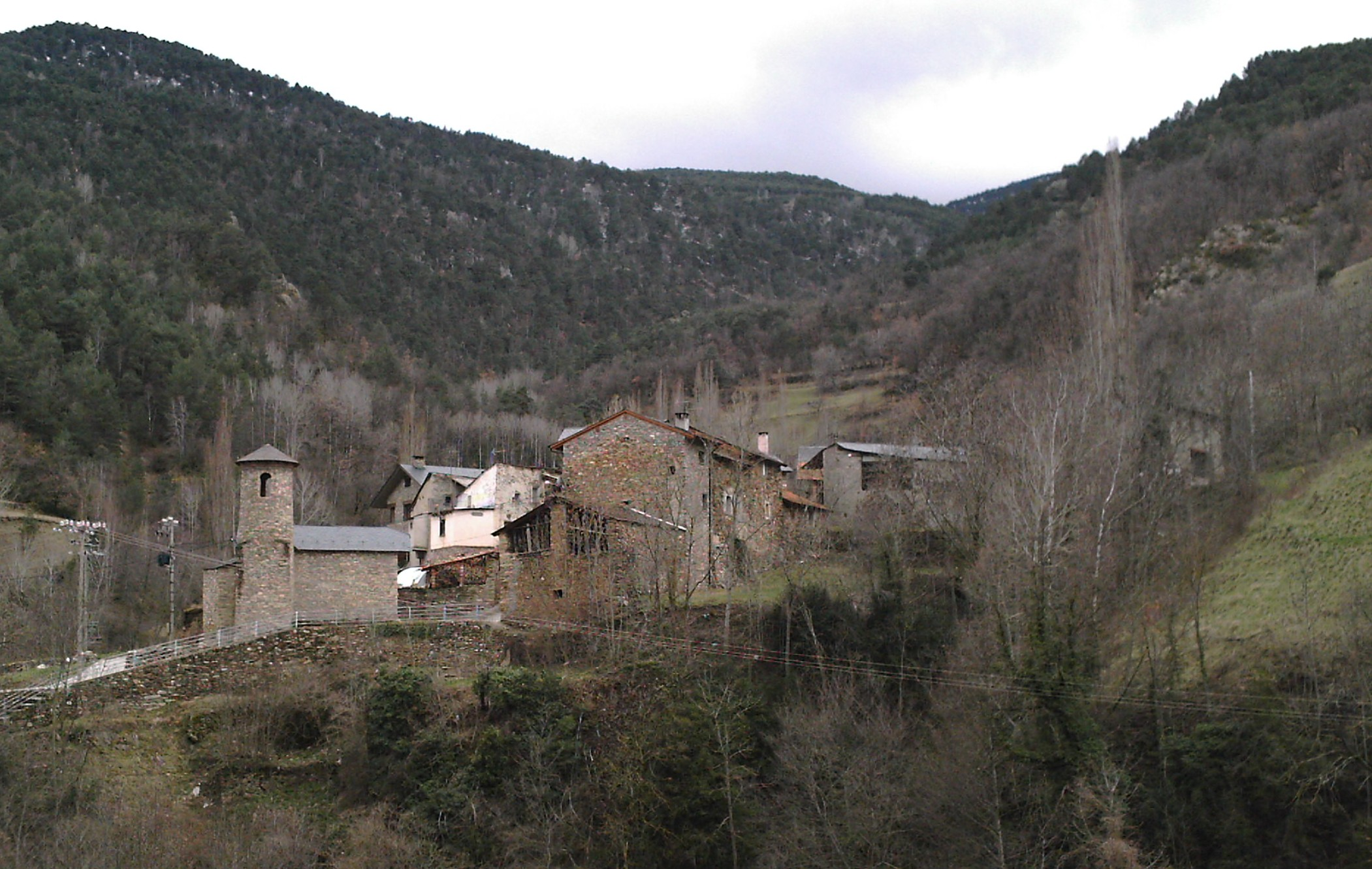
- Sant Joan Fumat

- Coat of arms

- Location in Spain Les Valls de Valira (Catalonia) Les Valls de Valira (Spain)
- Coordinates: 42.376°N 1.452°E
- Country: Spain
- Community: Catalonia
- Province: Lleida
- Comarca: Alt Urgell

Government
  - Mayor: Ricard Mateu Vidal (2015)

Area
  - Total: 171.2 km^{2} (66.1 sq mi)

Population (2025-01-01)
  - Total: 845
  - Density: 4.94/km^{2} (12.8/sq mi)
- Website: vallsvalira.ddl.net

Les Valls de Valira (Catalan pronunciation: [lez ˈbaʎz ðe βaˈliɾa]) is a municipality in the comarca of the Alt Urgell in Spain, that surrounds the south and south-west border of Andorra. It includes a small exclave to the south-east. It has a population of 845 (register office, 2025).

== Landmarks ==
- Sant Serni de Tavèrnoles

== See also ==
- Civís
- La Farga de Moles
- Os de Civís
