= Fontaneda, Andorra =

Village in Sant Julià de Lòria, Andorra

Fontaneda
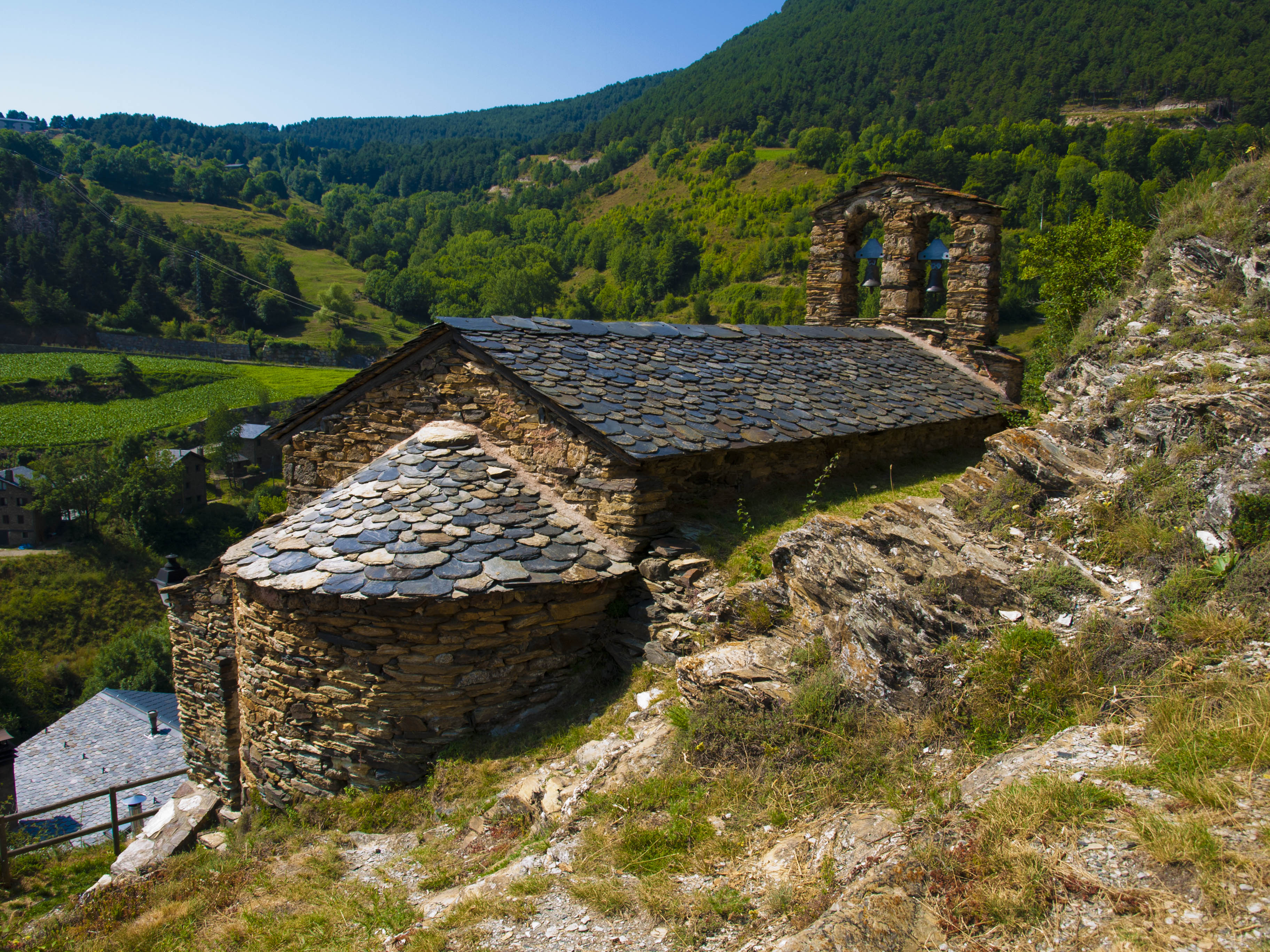
- Església de Sant Miquel de Fontaneda

- Location in Andorra
- Coordinates: 42°27′14″N 1°27′47″E
- Country: Andorra
- Parish: Sant Julià de Lòria
- Highest elevation: 1,390 m (4,560 ft)
- Lowest elevation: 1,300 m (4,300 ft)

Population (2023)
  - Total: 119

Fontaneda (Catalan pronunciation: [fontaˈneða]) is a village in Andorra and one of the country's 44 official poblacions. It is located in the parish of Sant Julià de Lòria.

== Geography ==
The village is located in the south-west of the country, near the border with Spain. It lies off a branch of the CS-140 secondary road and alongside the Riu del Llosar.

== Culture ==
The village is home to the Església de Sant Miquel de Fontaneda, a church commemorating Saint Michael the Archangel. Built in the 11th-12th century, it has since been designated an Andorran cultural heritage site.
