= Memorial 1714 =

- Predecessor: Commission Pro Fossar de les Moreres-Memorial 1714
- Formation: June 26, 1985; 40 years ago
- Founded at: Fossar de les Moreres

The Memorial 1714 is a civic and nonprofit association established on June 26, 1985 with the immediate purpose of dignifying and rehabilitating the Fossar de les Moreres, and of recovering and publicizing its history and its origins, without breaking continuity with the group of people who gathered in 1977 to restore the plate with the verse of Frederic Soler "Pitarra" in the Fossar's Place. This group formed in 1978 the original "Commission Pro Fossar de les Moreres-Memorial 1714". Nowadays the association dedicates its efforts to preserving and disseminating the history of Catalonia, although its main focus is on the events surrounding the siege of Barcelona in 1714, a critical moment in its history. In short, with its voluntary effort, the 1714 Memorial keeps the flame of Catalonia's history alive at Fossar de les Moreres.

== Social siege ==
The headquarters are located in Fossar de les Moreres, given that the center of the association's work is closely related to this historic place in Barcelona. This memorial commemorates those who died defending the Constitutions and freedoms of Catalonia during the War of Succession. The outcome of the conflict led to the disappearance of the Catalan State and left the Catalan Nation vulnerable to Bourbon absolutism.

== Objectives ==
The association aims to:

1. Disseminating the Catalan reality : Making known the national reality of Catalonia and its geographical context.
2. Educate about history : Foster understanding and awareness of Catalan history, especially the War of Succession and its consequences

== Activities ==
The 1714 Memorial organizes several activities:

1. Days : Five key dates with civic, patriotic and educational content.
2. Exhibitions : Visual shows that contribute to historical recovery.
3. Publications : journals, manifestos and books that share research and knowledge.

== Books ==
- Barcelona 1713, capital d'un Estat. Barcelona: Llibres de l'índex, 2013. ISBN 978-84-941338-4-8
- Peñarroja, J. Barcelona: sentir l'onze de setembre 1714-2014 (en francès). Llibres de l'Índex, 2007 (Barcelona: sentir l'onze de setembre 1714-2014). ISBN 978-84-96563-55-1
