= La Farga de Moles =

- village
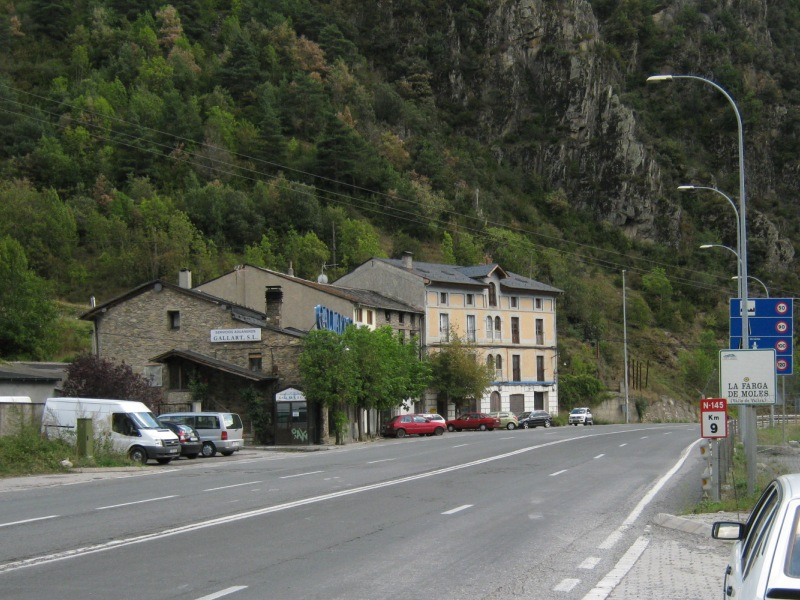
- View of La Farga de Moles from the N-145 road

- Location in Catalonia#Location in Spain La Farga de Moles (Spain)
- Coordinates: 42°25′50″N 1°28′03″E
- Country: Spain
- Autonomous community: Catalonia
- Province: Lleida
- Comarca: Alt Urgell
- Municipality: Les Valls de Valira
- Elevation: 840 m (2,760 ft)

Population (2020)
  - Total: 14
- Time zone: UTC+1 (CET)
  - Summer (DST): UTC+2 (CEST)
- Postal code: 25798

La Farga de Moles is a village located in the Les Valls de Valira, a municipality within the province of Lleida and autonomous community of Catalonia, in eastern Spain. The village is located next to the Gran Valira river, on the edge of Andorra's borders. The N-145 road is the main communication route.
