= N-145 road (Spain) =

National road in Catalonia, Spain

National road N-145
- Carretera nacional N-145

Route information
- Length: 9.7 km (6.0 mi)

Major junctions
- From: La Seu d'Urgell, N-260
- To: Andorra, CG-1

Location
- Country: Spain

Highway system
- Highways in Spain; Autopistas and autovías; National Roads

The N-145 is a Spanish national road in Catalonia, Spain. It is 9.7 km (6.0 mi) long and runs through the comarca of Alt Urgell, parallel to the Gran Valira. It connects the town of La Seu d'Urgell with Andorra through La Farga de Moles.

== Improvement ==
In 2013, the improvement of the N-145 was completed. These works consisted of asphalting part of the road, the construction of a false tunnel to prevent the fall of rocks near the customs office and the construction of the Túnel del Bordar near Anserall. With the construction of this tunnel, access to Anserall has been improved and renewed. The tunnel is 356 meters long and has more than 20 meters of false tunnel at each mouth. The interior of the tunnel has a capacity for three lanes, although there are only two, one for each direction, with a safety separation in the middle.
