= Bixessarri =

Village in Sant Julià de Lòria, Andorra

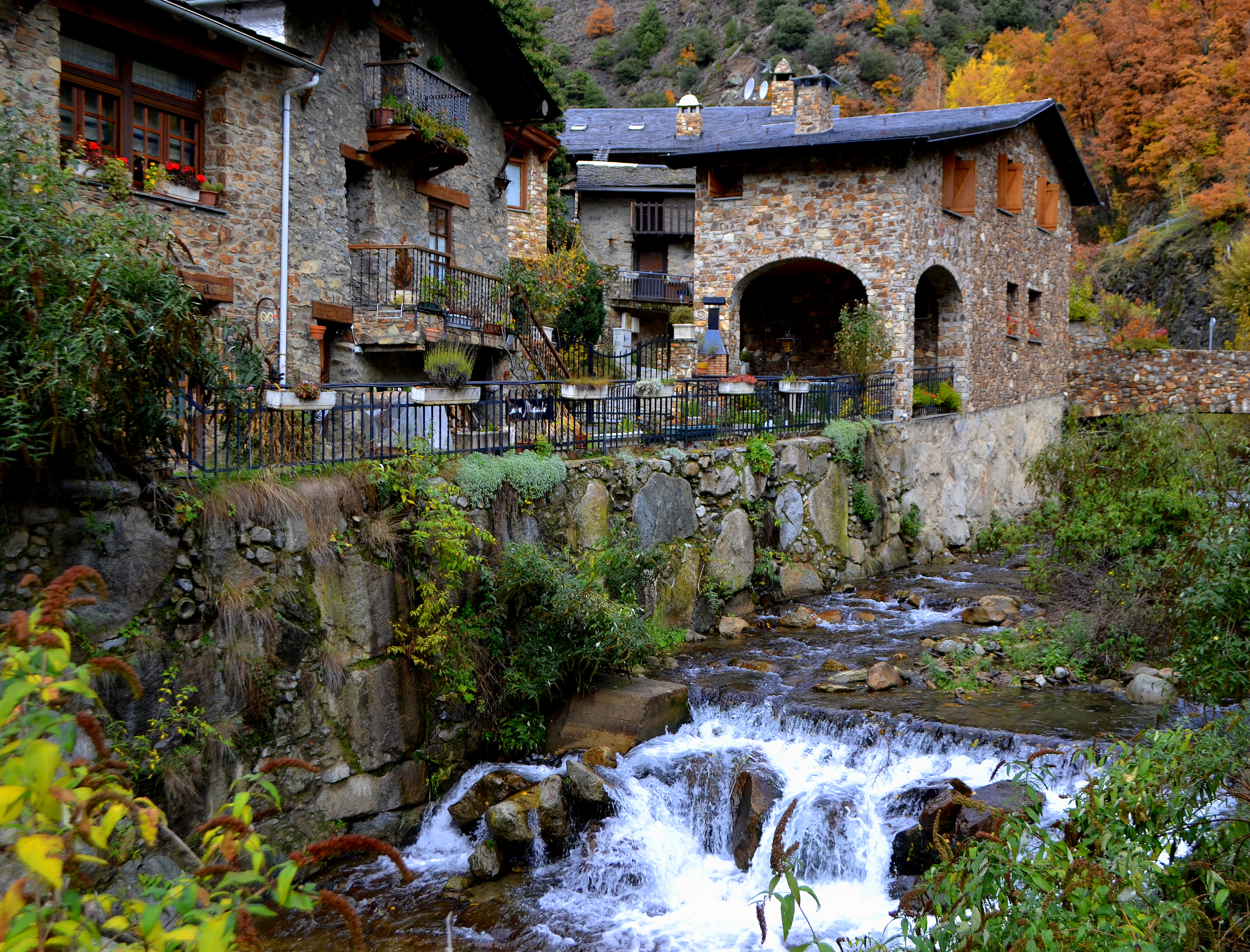
- Os River in Bixessarri

- Location in Andorra
- Coordinates: 42°29′0″N 1°27′31″E
- Country: Andorra
- Parish: Sant Julià de Lòria
- Highest elevation: 1,230 m (4,040 ft)
- Lowest elevation: 1,190 m (3,900 ft)

Population (2023)
  - Total: 61

Bixessarri (Catalan pronunciation: [biʃeˈsari]) is a village in Andorra located in the parish of Sant Julià de Lòria. As of 2023, it had a population of 40 residents.

== Geography ==
The village is located in the south-west of the country, near the border with Spain. It lies on the CG-6 main road.

The River Os flows through Bixessarri which has well-preserved Roman-style bridges.

== Culture ==
The village is home to the Església de Sant Esteve de Bixessarri, a church commemorating Saint Stephen. It was built in 1701 and has since been designated an Andorran cultural heritage site.
