= Gran Enciclopèdia Catalana =

Catalan-language encyclopedia published in 1968

Coordinates: 41°24′45″N 2°12′39″E

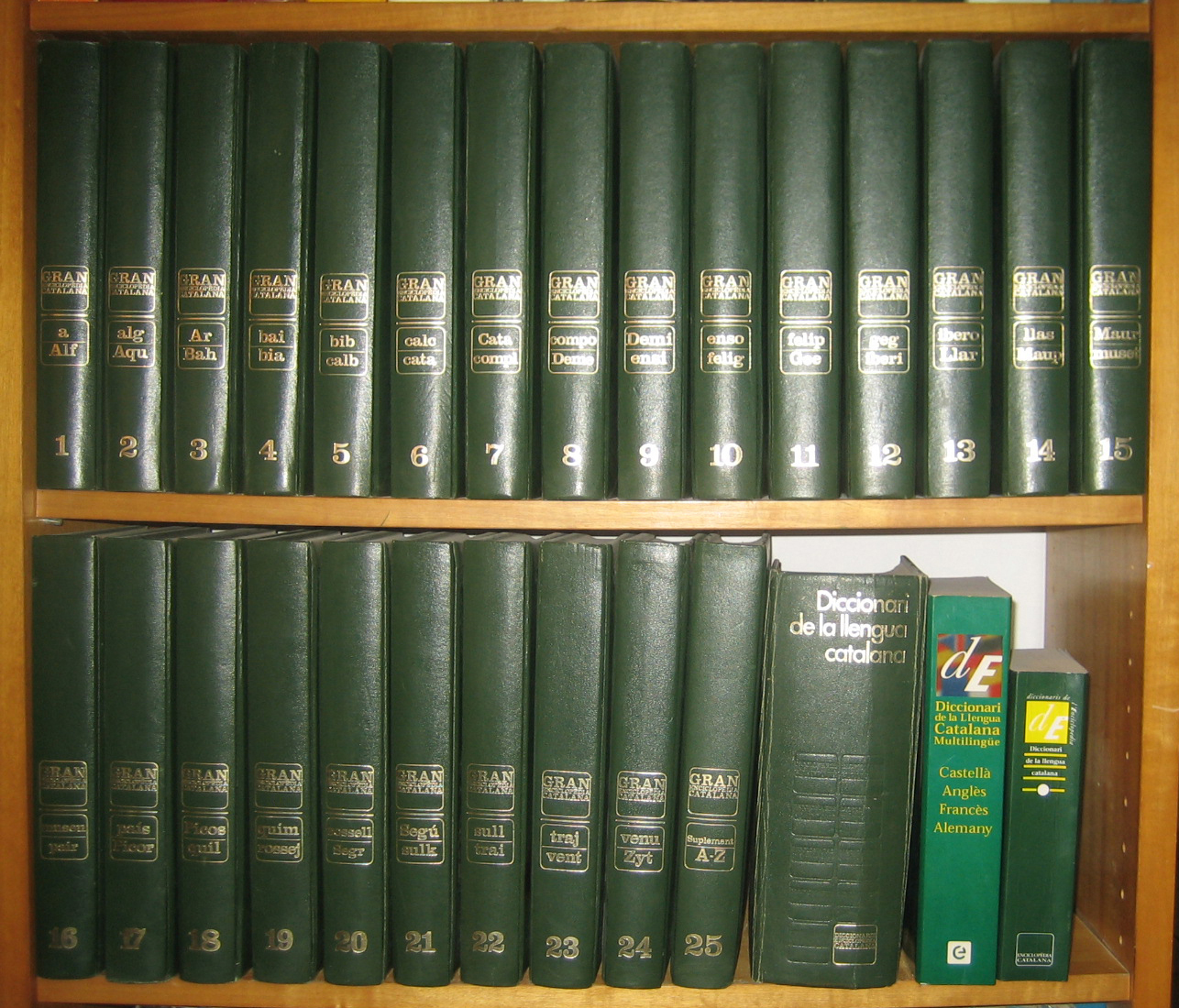
The Great Catalan Encyclopedia volumes, the Catalan Language Dictionary and the Multilingual Dictionary

The Gran Enciclopèdia Catalana (English: the Great Catalan Encyclopedia) is a Catalan-language encyclopedia, started in fascicles, and published in 1968 by Edicions 62. The soul of the work was written by Max Cahner, and the first director was Jordi Carbonell. From the second volume the work had its own publisher: Enciclopedia Catalana SA with Jordi Pujol, and the new director was Joan Carreras i Martí.

== Overview ==
The encyclopedia collects alphabetical entries about different subjects: history, geography, cultural studies, etc. It includes worldwide views as well as, when appropriate, Catalan viewpoints and information (meaning that the work is very thorough and often written with first hand information). It also contains a dictionary of common vocabulary, which was reviewed in the first edition of the work by Ramon Aramon i Serra.

GEC had a fixed team that wrote the content, and furthermore a broad set of partners, among which were the most prominent experts in each subject, which was involved in the preparation of the GEC with a great desire for service to the Catalan people.

Later editions have come out with several volumes and an appendix, as well as a digital edition. In 1991 it received the Cross of Saint George.

The Great Catalan Encyclopedia gained popularity and sold well, causing the encyclopedia to expand to include a broader series of historical, geographical, and lexical issues.

== Editions ==
- First edition: July 1969
- Second edition: June 1986
- First reprint: April 1988
- Second reprint: March 1989
- Third reprint: June 1990
- Fourth reprint (updated): February 1992
- Fifth reprint: September 1992
- Sixth reprint (updated): October 1993
- Seventh reprint (updated): July 1994
- Eighth reprint (updated): January 1995
- Ninth reprint (updated): January 1996
- Tenth reprint (updated): May 1998
- Eleventh reprint (updated): October 2000.

== See also ==
- Jordi Peñarroja
