= Sant Julià de Lòria =

Parish in southern Andorra

Coordinates: 42°27′54″N 1°29′28″E

- Parish
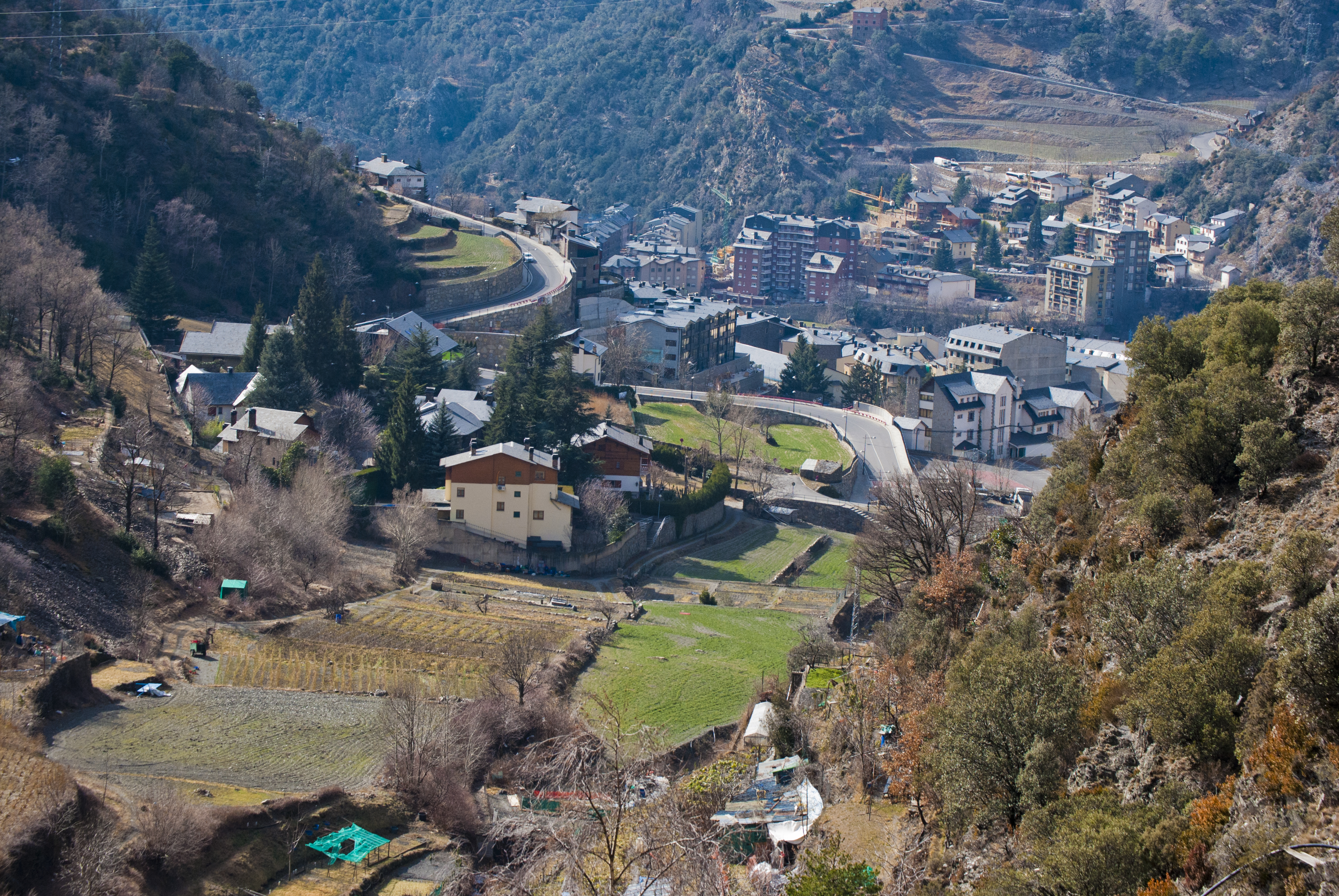
- Town of Sant Julia de Loria

- Flag Coat of arms

- Sant Julià de Lòria within Andorra

- Sant Julià de Lòria within Andorra
- Country: Andorra
- Seat: Sant Julià de Lòria
- Villages: List: Aixàs, Aixirivall, Aixovall, Auvinyà, Bixessarri, Canòlic, Certers, Fontaneda, Juberri, Llumeneres, Nagol

Government
  - Mayor: Cerni Cairat Perrigault (DL)

Area
  - Total: 60 km^{2} (23 sq mi)
- Elevation: 908 m (2,979 ft)

Population (2023)
  - Total: 9,915
  - Density: 170/km^{2} (430/sq mi)
- Postal code: AD600
- Website: www.comusantjulia.ad

Sant Julià de Lòria (Catalan pronunciation: [ˈsaɲ dʒuliˈa ðe ˈlɔɾia]) is one of the seven parishes of Andorra. Located in the south of the country, it is spread around the town of the same name along the banks of the Gran Valira River. Spread around an area of 60 km^{2} (23 sq mi), the region incorporates 11 villages. It is bordered by the capital Andorra la Vella in the north, Escaldes-Engordany in the northeast and the Spanish region of Catalonia along the other sides. With an estimated population of 9,915 individuals in 2023, it is one of the least populated amongst the parishes of Andorra.

== Geography ==
Sant Julià de Lòria is one of the eight parishes of Andorra. Located in the south of the country, it is spread around the town of the same name. The town of Sant Julià de Lòria is the seat of the parish, and is headed by a mayor. It is situated in the Eastern Pyrenees region on the banks of the Gran Valira River, the largest river in Andorra. It is bordered by the capital Andorra la Vella in the north, Escaldes-Engordany in the northeast and the Spanish region of Catalonia along the other sides. Spread around an area of 60 km^{2} (23 sq mi), the region incorporates five quarts which consist of 11 villages–Bixessarri, Aixàs, Aixovall, Certers, Llumeneres, Nagol, Aixirivall, Auvinyà, Juberri, Fontaneda, and Canòlic. The Naturlandia park occupies over an area of 100 hectares (250 acres), and consists of various hill slopes at altitudes ranging between 1,600–2,000 m (5,200–6,600 ft).

== Demographics ==
With an estimated population of 9,915 individuals in 2023, it is one of the least populated amongst the parishes of Andorra. The University of Andorra, the only university in the country, is located in the parish. The region was a major center of tobacco processing in the 20th century. It is now a major shopping center, with large malls situated close to the Spanish border.

== Transport ==
The region is well connected by road to the other parts of the country, and with the neighboring country of Spain. Public transport buses connect the town with Spanish towns of Barcelona, Vic, Tarragona, Lleida, Girona, and French towns of Toulouse and Hospitalet. While Andorra does not have an airport, the Andorra–La Seu d'Urgell Airport in Catalonia, located about 12 km (7.5 mi) away, serves the region. Other major international airports include the El Prat airport at Barcelona and Toulouse-Blagnac airport.

== Places of interest ==
The Sant Serni de Nagol Church was built in the 11th century CE. The Tobacco museum is located on the premises of the old tobacco factory, which functioned till 1957. The region has more than 20 km (12 mi) trails for alpine skiing. The Naturlandia park has a 5,300 m (17,400 ft) course for alpine toboggan, the longest such course in Europe. There are also ropeways, trekking trails, and other adventure activities in the park.

== Notable people ==
- Carme Travesset (1925–2022), first female to hold political office in Andorra.
- Òscar Ribas Reig (1936–2020), the first prime minister of Andorra in 1982
- Gilbert Saboya Sunyé (born 1966 in Sant Julià de Lòria), former deputy prime minister of Andorra
- Antoni Bernadó (born 1966 in Sant Julià de Lòria), marathon runner and five time Olympian
- Canòlic Mingorance (born 1976 in Sant Julià de Lòria) judge of the European Court of Human Rights since 2025
- Helena Mas (born 1979 in Sant Julià de Lòria), Minister of Health of Andorra since 2023
- Marina Fernández (born 1996 in Sant Julià de Lòria), footballer
- Jordi Aláez (born 1998 in Sant Julià de Lòria), footballer
