= Fratricide (disambiguation) =

Fratricide is the act of killing one's brother.

Fratricide may also refer to:

- Fratricide (film), a 1922 German silent drama
- "A Fratricide", a short story by Franz Kafka
- Friendly fire, an unintentional military attack on forces of the same side
  - Nuclear fratricide, the inadvertent destruction of nuclear weapon systems by other warheads in the same attack
  - EW fratricide, electronic warfare operations that interfere with friendly military capabilities

== See also ==
- Brothers War (disambiguation)
- List of fratricides in fiction
- Sororicide, the act of killing one's sister
