= October 18 =

October 18 this year in various calendars
- Sunday, 18 October 2026
Akan	Kwakwasi
Armenian	30 Sahmi 1476
Aztec	Izcalli 16, 9 Ātl
Babylonian	5 Tashritu, 2337 SE
Balinese pawukon	Menga, Beteng, Jaya, Pon, Was, Redite of Dukut, Guru, Ogan, Suka
Bengali	2 Kartik, BS 1433
Chinese	Yin Wood Ox・Room Mansion; Fire Horse Year, Month 9, Day 9 (Hanlu, 5 days until Shuangjiang)
Common Era	18 October 2026 CE
Coptic	8 Paopi, AM 1743
Egyptian	5 Phamenoth, 2775 NE
Ethiopian	8 Ṭeqemt, 2019 Amätä Məhrät
French Republican	Décade III, Sextidi de Vendémiaire de l'Année 235 de la République
Gregorian	18 October, AD 2026
Hebrew	7 Cheshvan, AM 5787
Hindu	Pūrvāṣāḍha・Sukarman; Solar: 1 Kārtika, 1948 SE; Lunisolar: Aṣṭamī, Śukla pakṣa of Āśvina, 2083 VE; Rāudra・5127 KY・1,872,866
Icelandic	Sunnudagur, 25 Haustmánuður 2026
Islamic	6 Jumada al-awwal, AH 1448 (using tabular method)
ISO week date	2026-W42-7
Japanese	8 Nagatsuki, Reiwa 8 (Kanro, 5 days until Sōkō)
Julian	5 October, AD 2026 (AM 7535)
Julian day	2461332
Korean	8 Gaedal, 4359 DE
Maya	13.0.14.0.9; 2 Zac, 9 Muluc
Roman	ante diem III Nonas Octobres, MMDCCLXXIX AUC
Solar Hijri	26 Mehr, SH 1405
Tibetan	8 tha skar, me pho rta 2153 or 1772 or 1000

<<	October					>>
Su	Mo	Tu	We	Th	Fr	Sa
				1	2	3
4	5	6	7	8	9	10
11	12	13	14	15	16	17
18	19	20	21	22	23	24
25	26	27	28	29	30	31
2026

October 18 in recent years
2026 (Sunday)
2025 (Saturday)
2024 (Friday)
2023 (Wednesday)
2022 (Tuesday)
2021 (Monday)
2020 (Sunday)
2019 (Friday)
2018 (Thursday)
2017 (Wednesday)

October 18 is the 291st day of the year (292nd in leap years) in the Gregorian calendar; 74 days remain until the end of the year.

== Events ==
=== Pre-1600 ===
- 33 – Heartbroken by the deaths of her sons Nero and Drusus, and banished to the island of Pandateria by Tiberius, Agrippina the Elder dies of self-inflicted starvation.
- 320 – Pappus of Alexandria, Greek philosopher, observes an eclipse of the Sun and writes a commentary on The Great Astronomer (Almagest).
- 614 – King Chlothar II promulgates the Edict of Paris (Edictum Chlotacharii), a sort of Frankish Magna Carta that defends the rights of the Frankish nobles while it excludes Jews from all civil employment in the Frankish Kingdom.
- 629 – Dagobert I is crowned King of the Franks.
- 1009 – The Church of the Holy Sepulchre, a Christian church in Jerusalem, is completely destroyed by the Fatimid caliph Al-Hakim bi-Amr Allah, who hacks the Church's foundations down to bedrock.
- 1016 – The Danes defeat the English in the Battle of Assandun.
- 1081 – The Normans defeat the Byzantine Empire in the Battle of Dyrrhachium.
- 1166 – Michael the Syrian, one of the most important Syriac historians, is consecrated as Syriac Orthodox Patriarch at the Mor Bar Sauma Monastery.
- 1281 – Pope Martin IV excommunicates King Peter III of Aragon for usurping the crown of Sicily (a sentence renewed on 7 May and 18 November 1282).
- 1356 – Basel earthquake, the most significant historic seismological event north of the Alps, destroys the town of Basel, Switzerland.
- 1377 – Andronikos IV Palaiologos and his young son John are crowned by patriarch Macarius of Constantinople.
- 1540 – Spanish conquistador Hernando de Soto's forces destroy the fortified town of Mabila in present-day Alabama, killing Tuskaloosa.
- 1561 – In Japan the fourth Battle of Kawanakajima is fought between the forces of Uesugi Kenshin and Takeda Shingen, resulting in a draw.
- 1565 – Ships belonging to the Matsura clan of Japan fail to capture the Portuguese trading carrack in the Battle of Fukuda Bay, the first recorded naval battle between Japan and the West.
- 1597 – King Philip II of Spain sends his third and final armada against England, but it ends in failure due to storms. The remaining ships are captured or sunk by the English.
- 1599 – Michael the Brave, Prince of Wallachia, defeats the Army of Andrew Báthory in the Battle of Șelimbăr, leading to the first recorded unification of the Romanian people.

=== 1601–1900 ===
- 1630 – Frendraught Castle in Scotland, the home of James Crichton of Frendraught, burns down.
- 1648 – Boston shoemakers form the first American labor organization.
- 1748 – Signing of the Treaty of Aix-la-Chapelle ends the War of the Austrian Succession.
- 1775 – African-American poet Phillis Wheatley is freed from slavery.
- 1775 – American Revolutionary War: The Burning of Falmouth (now Portland, Maine).
- 1779 – American Revolutionary War: The Franco-American Siege of Savannah is lifted.
- 1851 – Herman Melville's Moby-Dick is first published as The Whale by Richard Bentley of London.
- 1860 – The Second Opium War finally ends at the Convention of Peking with the ratification of the Treaty of Tientsin, an unequal treaty.
- 1867 – United States takes possession of Alaska after purchasing it from Russia for $7.2 million. Celebrated annually in the state as Alaska Day.
- 1887 – Johannes Brahms conducts the premiere of his Double Concerto, composed for violinist Joseph Joachim and cellist Robert Hausmann.
- 1898 – The United States takes possession of Puerto Rico from Spain.
- 1900 – Count Bernhard von Bülow becomes chancellor of Germany.

=== 1901–present ===
- 1912 – First Balkan War: King Peter I of Serbia issues a declaration "To the Serbian People", as his country joins the war.
- 1912 – The Kingdom of Italy and the Ottoman Empire sign the treaty of Ouchy, by which the Italo-Turkish War is ended and the Ottomans loose Libya to Italy.
- 1914 – The Schoenstatt Apostolic Movement is founded in Germany.
- 1921 – The Crimean Autonomous Soviet Socialist Republic is formed as part of the Russian Soviet Federative Socialist Republic.
- 1922 – The British Broadcasting Company (later Corporation) is founded by a consortium, to establish a nationwide network of radio transmitters to provide a national broadcasting service.
- 1929 – The Judicial Committee of the Privy Council overrules the Supreme Court of Canada in Edwards v. Canada when it declares that women are considered "Persons" under Canadian law.
- 1944 – World War II: Soviet Union begins the liberation of Czechoslovakia from Nazi Germany.
- 1944 – World War II: The state funeral of Field Marshal Erwin Rommel takes place in Ulm, Germany.
- 1945 – The USSR's nuclear program receives plans for the United States plutonium bomb from Klaus Fuchs at the Los Alamos National Laboratory.
- 1945 – A group of the Venezuelan Armed Forces, led by Mario Vargas, Marcos Pérez Jiménez and Carlos Delgado Chalbaud, stages a coup d'état against president Isaías Medina Angarita, who is overthrown by the end of the day.
- 1945 – Argentine military officer and politician Juan Perón marries actress Eva Duarte.
- 1954 – Texas Instruments announces the Regency TR-1, the first mass-produced transistor radio.
- 1963 – Félicette, a black and white female Parisian stray cat, becomes the first cat launched into space.
- 1967 – The Soviet probe Venera 4 reaches Venus and becomes the first spacecraft to measure the atmosphere of another planet.
- 1977 – German Autumn: A set of events revolving around the kidnapping of Hanns Martin Schleyer and the hijacking of a Lufthansa flight by the Red Army Faction (RAF) comes to an end when Schleyer is murdered and various RAF members allegedly commit suicide.
- 1978 – Based on the world's first children's art museum, the Henrik Igityan National Centre for Aesthetics opens in Yerevan.
- 1979 – The Federal Communications Commission (FCC) begins allowing people to have home satellite earth stations without a federal government license.
- 1989 – The Space Shuttle Atlantis launches on STS-34 to deploy the Jupiter-bound Galileo space probe.
- 1989 – A Ilyushin Il-76 of the Soviet Air Forces crashes into the Caspian Sea near Sumgait, killing 57.
- 1991 – The Supreme Council of Azerbaijan adopts a declaration of independence from the Soviet Union.
- 1992 – Merpati Nustantara Airlines Flight 5601 crashes into Mount Papandayan near the town of Garut in West Java, Indonesia, killing 31.
- 1993 – Space Shuttle Columbia is launched on STS-58 to perform life sciences research.
- 2003 – Bolivian gas conflict: Bolivian President Gonzalo Sánchez de Lozada is forced to resign and leave Bolivia.
- 2007 – Karachi bombing: A suicide attack on a motorcade carrying former Pakistani Prime Minister Benazir Bhutto kills 139 and wounds 450 more. Bhutto herself is uninjured.
- 2019 – NASA Astronauts Jessica Meir and Christina Koch take part in the first all-female spacewalk when they venture out of the International Space Station to replace a power controller.
- 2019 – Riots in Chile's capital Santiago escalate into open battles, with attacks reported at nearly all of the city's 164 Metro stations. President Sebastián Piñera later announces a 15-day state of emergency in the capital.

== Births ==
=== Pre-1600 ===
- 1127 – Emperor Go-Shirakawa of Japan (died 1192)
- 1130 – Zhu Xi, Chinese philosopher (died 1200)
- 1405 – Pope Pius II (died 1464)
- 1444 – John de Mowbray, 4th Duke of Norfolk (died 1476)
- 1482 – Philipp III, Count of Hanau-Lichtenberg (died 1538)
- 1517 – Manuel da Nóbrega, Portuguese-Brazilian priest and missionary (died 1570)
- 1523 – Anna Jagiellon, daughter of Sigismund I of Poland (died 1596)
- 1536 – William Lambarde, English antiquarian and politician (died 1601)
- 1547 – Justus Lipsius, Belgian philologist and scholar (died 1606)
- 1553 – Luca Marenzio, Italian composer (died 1599)
- 1587 – Lady Mary Wroth, English poet (died 1651)
- 1595 – Edward Winslow, American Pilgrim leader (died 1655)

=== 1601–1900 ===
- 1616 – Nicholas Culpeper, English botanist (died 1654)
- 1630 – Henry Powle, English politician (died 1692)
- 1634 – Luca Giordano, Italian painter and illustrator (died 1705)
- 1653 – Abraham van Riebeeck, South African-Dutch merchant and politician, Governor-General of the Dutch East Indies (died 1713)
- 1662 – Matthew Henry, Welsh minister and scholar (died 1714)
- 1663 – Prince Eugene of Savoy (died 1736)
- 1668 – John George IV, Elector of Saxony (died 1694)
- 1701 – Charles le Beau, French historian and author (died 1778)
- 1706 – Baldassare Galuppi, Italian harpsichord player and composer (died 1785)
- 1741 – Pierre Choderlos de Laclos, French general and author (died 1803)
- 1770 – Thomas Phillips, English artist (died 1845)
- 1777 – Heinrich von Kleist, German author and poet (died 1811)
- 1785 – Thomas Love Peacock, English author and poet (died 1866)
- 1792 – Lucas Alamán, Mexican politician and historian (died 1853)
- 1804 – Mongkut, Thai king (died 1868)
- 1818 – Charles Edward Mudie, English book publisher, founder of Mudie's Lending Library(died 1890)
- 1822 – Midhat Pasha, Ottoman civil servant and politician, 238th Grand Vizier of the Ottoman Empire (died 1883)
- 1831 – Frederick III, German Emperor (died 1888)
- 1831 - Robert Potter, author and minister (died 1908)
- 1836 – Frederick August Otto Schwarz, American businessman, founded FAO Schwarz (died 1911)
- 1844 – Harvey Washington Wiley, American chemist, leader in the passage of the 1906 Pure Food and Drug Act (died 1930)
- 1850 – Basil Hall Chamberlain, English-Swiss historian, author, and academic (died 1935)
- 1854 – Billy Murdoch, Australian cricketer (died 1911)
- 1854 – Charles Scribner II, American magazine and book publisher (died 1930)
- 1859 – Henri Bergson, French philosopher and theologian, Nobel Prize laureate (died 1941)
- 1862 – Mehmet Esat Bülkat, Ottoman general (died 1952)
- 1865 – Arie de Jong, Dutch linguist and author (died 1957)
- 1865 – Logan Pearsall Smith, American-English author and critic (died 1946)
- 1868 – Ernst Didring, Swedish author (died 1931)
- 1869 – Johannes Linnankoski, Finnish author (died 1913)
- 1870 – D. T. Suzuki, Japanese author and scholar (died 1966)
- 1872 – Mikhail Kuzmin, Russian poet and author (died 1936)
- 1873 – Ivanoe Bonomi, Italian lawyer and politician, 25th Prime Minister of Italy (died 1951)
- 1875 – Len Braund, English cricketer, coach, and umpire (died 1955)
- 1878 – James Truslow Adams, American historian and author (died 1949)
- 1880 – Ze'ev Jabotinsky, Ukrainian-Russian general, journalist, and theorist (died 1940)
- 1881 – Max Gerson, German-born American physician (died 1959)
- 1882 – Väinö Kivisalo, Finnish politician (died 1953)
- 1882 – Lucien Petit-Breton, French cyclist (died 1917)
- 1887 – Takashi Sakai, Japanese general and politician, Governor of Hong Kong (died 1946)
- 1888 – Paul Vermoyal, French actor (died 1925)
- 1893 – Sidney Holland, New Zealand lieutenant and politician, 25th Prime Minister of New Zealand (died 1961)
- 1893 – George Ohsawa, Japanese philosopher and academic (died 1966)
- 1894 – H. L. Davis, American author and poet (died 1960)
- 1894 – Tibor Déry, Hungarian author and translator (died 1977)
- 1897 – Isabel Briggs Myers, American theorist and author (died 1980)
- 1898 – Lotte Lenya, Austrian singer and actress (died 1981)

=== 1901–present ===
- 1902 – Miriam Hopkins, American actress (died 1972)
- 1902 – Pascual Jordan, German physicist and theorist (died 1980)
- 1903 – Lina Radke, German runner and coach (died 1983)
- 1904 – Aarne Juutilainen, Finnish army captain (died 1976)
- 1904 – A. J. Liebling, American journalist and author (died 1963)
- 1904 – Haim Shirman, Ukrainian-Israeli scholar and academic (died 1981)
- 1905 – Jan Gies, Dutch activist (died 1993)
- 1905 – Félix Houphouët-Boigny, Ivorian union leader and politician, 1st President of Côte d'Ivoire (died 1993)
- 1906 – James Brooks, American painter and educator (died 1992)
- 1909 – Norberto Bobbio, Italian philosopher and theorist (died 2004)
- 1914 – Raymond Lambert, Swiss mountaineer (died 1997)
- 1915 – Victor Sen Yung, American actor (died 1980)
- 1918 – Molly Geertsema, Dutch lawyer and politician, Deputy Prime Minister of the Netherlands (died 1991)
- 1918 – Konstantinos Mitsotakis, Greek lawyer and politician, 178th Prime Minister of Greece (died 2017)
- 1918 – Bobby Troup, American singer-songwriter, pianist, and actor (died 1999)
- 1919 – Ric Nordman, Canadian captain and politician (died 1996)
- 1919 – Anita O'Day, American singer (died 2006)
- 1919 – Pierre Trudeau, Canadian lawyer, academic, and politician, 15th Prime Minister of Canada (died 2000)
- 1919 – Camilla Williams, American soprano and educator (died 2012)
- 1920 – Melina Mercouri, Greek actress, singer, and politician, 9th Greek Minister of Culture (died 1994)
- 1921 – Jerry Cooke, Ukrainian-American photographer and journalist (died 2005)
- 1921 – Jesse Helms, American journalist and politician (died 2008)
- 1921 – Beatrice Helen Worsley, Mexican-Canadian computer scientist and academic (died 1972)
- 1923 – Jessie Mae Hemphill, American singer-songwriter and guitarist (died 2008)
- 1924 – Buddy MacMaster, Canadian singer-songwriter and fiddler (died 2014)
- 1925 – Ramiz Alia, Albanian politician, 1st President of Albania (died 2011)
- 1926 – Chuck Berry, American singer-songwriter and guitarist (died 2017)
- 1926 – Klaus Kinski, German-American actor, director, and screenwriter (died 1991)
- 1927 – Marv Rotblatt, American baseball player (died 2013)
- 1927 – George C. Scott, American actor and director (died 1999)
- 1928 – Maurice El Mediouni, Algerian pianist and composer (died 2024)
- 1928 – Keith Jackson, American sportscaster and actor (died 2018)
- 1928 – Dick Taverne, English lawyer and politician (died 2025)
- 1929 – Violeta Chamorro, Nicaraguan publisher and politician, President of Nicaragua (died 2025)
- 1929 – Hillard Elkins, American producer and manager (died 2010)
- 1929 – Kees Fens, Dutch author and critic (died 2008)
- 1929 – Frank Stanmore, Australian rugby league player (died 2005)
- 1930 – Flora Fraser, 21st Lady Saltoun, Scottish politician (died 2024)
- 1930 – Esther Hautzig, Lithuanian-American author (died 2009)
- 1931 – Chris Albertson, Icelandic-American historian, journalist, and producer (died 2019)
- 1931 – Ien Dales, Dutch civil servant and politician, Dutch Minister of the Interior (died 1994)
- 1932 – Roger Climpson, English-Australian journalist (died 2025)
- 1932 – Vytautas Landsbergis, Lithuanian musicologist and politician
- 1933 – Forrest Gregg, American football player and coach (died 2019)
- 1933 – Irwin M. Jacobs, American electrical engineer, businessman, and entrepreneur
- 1933 – Ludovico Scarfiotti, Italian race car driver (died 1968)
- 1934 – Inger Stevens, Swedish-American actress (died 1970)
- 1935 – Peter Boyle, American actor (died 2006)
- 1936 – Jaime Lucas Ortega y Alamino, Cuban cardinal (died 2019)
- 1938 – Robert Dove, American lawyer and politician (died 2021)
- 1938 – Dawn Wells, American model and actress, Miss Nevada 1959 (died 2020)
- 1939 – Flavio Cotti, Swiss lawyer and politician, 82nd President of the Swiss Confederation (died 2020)
- 1939 – Mike Ditka, American football player, coach, and sportscaster (died 2026)
- 1939 – Lee Harvey Oswald, American assassin of John F. Kennedy (died 1963)
- 1939 – Paddy Reilly, Irish folk singer and guitarist
- 1939 – Jan Erik Vold, Norwegian poet, author, and translator
- 1940 – Talitha Getty, actress and model of Dutch extraction (died 1971)
- 1940 – Cynthia Weil, American songwriter (died 2023)
- 1941 – Timothy Bell, Baron Bell, English businessman (died 2019)
- 1941 – Martha Burk, American psychologist and author
- 1942 – Gianfranco Ravasi, Italian cardinal and scholar
- 1943 – Christine Charbonneau, Canadian singer-songwriter (died 2014)
- 1943 – Birthe Rønn Hornbech, Danish police officer and politician, Danish Minister for Ecclesiastical Affairs
- 1945 – Huell Howser, American television host and actor (died 2013)
- 1945 – Chris Shays, American politician
- 1946 – James Robert Baker, American author and screenwriter (died 1997)
- 1946 – Frank Beamer, American football player and coach
- 1946 – Joe Egan, Scottish singer-songwriter (died 2024)
- 1946 – Dafydd Elis-Thomas, Welsh academic and politician (died 2025)
- 1946 – Howard Shore, Canadian composer, conductor, and producer
- 1947 – Paul Chuckle, English comedian, actor, and screenwriter
- 1947 – Job Cohen, Dutch scholar and politician, Mayor of Amsterdam
- 1947 – John Johnson, American basketball player (died 2016)
- 1947 – Joe Morton, American actor
- 1947 – Laura Nyro, American singer-songwriter and pianist (died 1997)
- 1947 – Gary Sullivan, Australian rugby league player
- 1948 – Hans Köchler, Austrian philosopher, author, and academic
- 1948 – Ntozake Shange, American author, poet, and playwright (died 2018)
- 1949 – George Hendrick, American baseball player and coach
- 1949 – Gary Richrath, American guitarist, songwriter, and producer (died 2015)
- 1950 – Wendy Wasserstein, American playwright and author (died 2006)
- 1951 – Mike Antonovich, American ice hockey player and coach
- 1951 – Pam Dawber, American actress and producer
- 1951 – Terry McMillan, American author and screenwriter
- 1951 – David Normington, English civil servant and politician
- 1951 – Nic Potter, English bass player and songwriter (died 2013)
- 1952 – Roy Dias, Sri Lankan cricketer and coach
- 1952 – Paul Geroski, American-English economist and academic (died 2005)
- 1952 – Chuck Lorre, American director, producer, and screenwriter
- 1952 – Patrick Morrow, Canadian mountaineer and photographer
- 1952 – Bảo Ninh, Vietnamese soldier and author
- 1952 – Allen Ripley, American baseball player (died 2014)
- 1952 – Jerry Royster, American baseball player, coach, and manager
- 1954 – Nick Houghton, English general
- 1954 – Arliss Howard, American actor, director, producer, and screenwriter
- 1954 – Bob Weinstein, American film executive
- 1955 – Jean-Pierre Hautier, Belgian journalist and television host (died 2012)
- 1955 – Vanessa Briscoe Hay, American singer-songwriter and keyboard player
- 1955 – Timmy Mallett, English radio and television host
- 1955 – Stu Mead, American painter and illustrator
- 1955 – David Twohy, American director, producer, and screenwriter
- 1955 – Rita Verdonk, Dutch journalist and politician, Dutch Minister of Justice
- 1955 – Denis Watson, Zimbabwean golfer
- 1955 – Mark Welland, English physicist and academic
- 1956 – Craig Bartlett, American animator, producer, screenwriter, and voice actor
- 1956 – Martina Navratilova, Czech-American tennis player and coach
- 1956 – Jim Talent, American lawyer and politician
- 1957 – Jon Lindstrom, American actor, director, producer, and screenwriter
- 1957 – Catherine Ringer, French singer-songwriter, dancer, and actress
- 1958 – Thomas Hearns, American boxer
- 1958 – Megumi Ishii, Japanese actress and politician
- 1958 – Letitia James, American lawyer, activist and politician
- 1958 – Kjell Samuelsson, Swedish ice hockey player and coach
- 1959 – Kirby Chambliss, American pilot
- 1959 – Mauricio Funes, Salvadoran politician, former president of El Salvador (died 2025)
- 1959 – Milcho Manchevski, Macedonian-American director and screenwriter
- 1959 – John Nord, American wrestler
- 1960 – Erin Moran, American actress (died 2017)
- 1960 – Jean-Claude Van Damme, Belgian martial artist, actor, and producer, and screenwriter
- 1961 – Wynton Marsalis, American trumpet player, composer, and educator
- 1961 – Rick Moody, American author and composer
- 1961 – Gladstone Small, Barbadian-English cricketer
- 1962 – Min Ko Naing, Burmese activist
- 1962 – Vincent Spano, American actor, director, and producer
- 1963 – Sigvart Dagsland, Norwegian singer, pianist and composer
- 1964 – Dan Lilker, American singer-songwriter and bass player
- 1964 – Charles Stross, English journalist, author, and programmer
- 1965 – Zakir Naik, Indian Islamic preacher; founder and president of the Islamic Research Foundation (IRF)
- 1965 – Curtis Stigers, American singer-songwriter and guitarist
- 1966 – Dave Price, American journalist and game show host
- 1967 – Eric Stuart, American singer-songwriter, guitarist, and voice actor
- 1968 – Rhod Gilbert, Welsh comedian
- 1968 – Stuart Law, Australian cricketer and coach
- 1968 – Michael Stich, German tennis player and sportscaster
- 1969 – Volker Neumüller, German talent manager
- 1969 – Nelson Vivas, Argentinian footballer, coach, and manager
- 1970 – Doug Mirabelli, American baseball player and coach
- 1970 – Mike Starink, Dutch television host and actor
- 1971 – Nick O'Hern, Australian golfer
- 1972 – Mika Ninagawa, Japanese photographer and director
- 1972 – Alex Tagliani, Canadian race car driver
- 1973 – Stephen Allan, Australian golfer
- 1973 – James Foley, American photographer and journalist (died 2014)
- 1973 – Michalis Kapsis, Greek footballer
- 1973 – Rachel Nichols, American journalist and sportscaster
- 1973 – Sarah Winckless, English rower
- 1974 – Robbie Savage, Welsh footballer and sportscaster
- 1974 – Peter Svensson, Swedish guitarist and songwriter
- 1974 – Amish Tripathi, Indian author
- 1974 – Zhou Xun, Chinese actress and singer
- 1975 – Alex Cora, Puerto Rican baseball player and manager
- 1975 – Josh Sawyer, American video game designer
- 1977 – Flavia Colgan, Brazilian-American journalist
- 1977 – Kunal Kapoor, Indian actor
- 1977 – Ryan Nelsen, New Zealand-American soccer player and coach
- 1977 – David Vuillemin, French motorcycle racer
- 1978 – Mike Tindall, English rugby player
- 1978 – Kenji Wu, Taiwanese singer-songwriter and actor
- 1979 – Jaroslav Drobný, Czech footballer
- 1979 – Ne-Yo, American singer, songwriter, record producer, dancer, and actor
- 1979 – Damon Scott, British entertainer
- 1980 – Birsen Yavuz, Turkish sprinter and hurdler
- 1981 – Nathan Hauritz, Australian cricketer
- 1981 – Tina Hergold, Slovenian tennis player
- 1981 – Greg Warren, American football player
- 1982 – Thierry Amiel, French singer-songwriter
- 1982 – Michael Dingsdag, Dutch footballer
- 1982 – Simon Gotch, American wrestler
- 1982 – Mark Sampson, Welsh footballer and manager
- 1983 – Dante, Brazilian footballer
- 1984 – Robert Harting, German discus thrower
- 1984 – Freida Pinto, Indian actress and model
- 1984 – Esperanza Spalding, American singer-songwriter and bassist
- 1984 – Lindsey Vonn, American skier
- 1984 – Milo Yiannopoulos, British journalist and public speaker
- 1985 – Yoenis Céspedes, Cuban baseball player
- 1985 – Andrew Garcia, American singer-songwriter and guitarist
- 1986 – Wilma Elles, German actress and fashion designer
- 1987 – Zac Efron, American actor and singer
- 1987 – Freja Beha Erichsen, Danish model
- 1988 – Tessa Schram, Dutch director and actress
- 1989 – Laci Green, American YouTube personality, video blogger, sex educator, and activist
- 1989 – Joy Lauren, American actress, director, and producer
- 1989 – Riisa Naka, Japanese model and actress
- 1990 – Drew Crawford, American basketball player
- 1990 – Brittney Griner, American basketball player
- 1990 – Bristol Palin, American public speaker and reality television personality
- 1991 – Roly Bonevacia, Dutch footballer
- 1991 – Tyler Posey, American actor and musician
- 1991 – Toby Regbo, English actor
- 1991 – Zohran Mamdani, American politician, mayor of New York City
- 1992 – John John Florence, American surfer
- 1992 – Barry Keoghan, Irish actor
- 1993 – Ivan Cavaleiro, Portuguese footballer
- 1994 – Enhō Akira, Japanese sumo wrestler
- 1994 – Pascal Wehrlein, German-Mauritian race car driver
- 1996 – Terance Mann, American basketball player
- 1998 – Janalynn Castelino, Italian-Indian singer-songwriter
- 2000 – Sophie Thatcher, American actress

== Deaths ==
=== Pre-1600 ===
- 31 – Lucius Aelius Sejanus, Roman politician (born 20 BC)
- 325 – Emperor Ming of Jin (born 299)
- 707 – Pope John VII (born 650)
- 815 – Abu'l-Saraya, Zaydi rebel leader
- 1035 – Sancho III of Pamplona (born 992)
- 1081 – Nikephoros Palaiologos, Byzantine general
- 1101 – Hugh I, Count of Vermandois (born 1053)
- 1141 – Leopold, Duke of Bavaria (born 1108)
- 1214 – John de Gray, bishop of Norwich
- 1366 – Petrus Torkilsson, Archbishop of Uppsala
- 1382 – James Butler, 2nd Earl of Ormond, Irish politician, Lord Justice of Ireland (born 1331)
- 1417 – Pope Gregory XII (born 1326)
- 1442 – Infante João of Portugal (born 1400)
- 1480 – Uhwudong, Korean dancer and poet (born 1440)
- 1503 – Pope Pius III (born 1439)
- 1508 – Patrick Hepburn, 1st Earl of Bothwell, Lord High Admiral of Scotland
- 1511 – Philippe de Commines, French-speaking Fleming in the courts of Burgundy and France (born 1447)
- 1526 – Lucas Vázquez de Ayllón, Spanish explorer (born 1475)
- 1541 – Margaret Tudor, queen of James IV of Scotland (born 1489)
- 1545 – John Taverner, English organist and composer (born 1490)
- 1558 – Mary of Hungary (born 1505)
- 1561 – Yamamoto Kansuke, Japanese samurai (born 1501)
- 1564 – Johannes Acronius Frisius, Dutch physician and mathematician (born 1520)
- 1570 – Manuel da Nóbrega, Portuguese-Brazilian priest and missionary (born 1517)

=== 1601–1900 ===
- 1604 – Igram van Achelen, Dutch lawyer and politician (born 1528)
- 1646 – Isaac Jogues, French priest, missionary, and martyr (born 1607)
- 1667 – Fasilides, Ethiopian emperor (born 1603)
- 1678 – Jacob Jordaens, Belgian painter illustrator (born 1593)
- 1739 – António José da Silva, Brazilian-Portuguese playwright (born 1705)
- 1744 – Sarah Churchill, Duchess of Marlborough (born 1660)
- 1770 – John Manners, Marquess of Granby, English general and politician, Lord Lieutenant of Derbyshire (born 1721)
- 1775 – Christian August Crusius, German philosopher and theologian (born 1715)
- 1817 – Etienne Nicolas Méhul, French pianist and composer (born 1763)
- 1865 – Henry John Temple, 3rd Viscount Palmerston, English soldier and politician, Prime Minister of the United Kingdom (born 1784)
- 1871 – Charles Babbage, English mathematician and engineer, invented the mechanical computer (born 1791)
- 1876 – Francis Preston Blair, American journalist (born 1791)
- 1886 – Philipp Franz von Siebold, German physician and botanist (born 1796)
- 1889 – Antonio Meucci, Italian-American engineer (born 1808)
- 1892 – William W. Chapman, American lawyer and politician (born 1808)
- 1893 – Charles Gounod, French composer and educator (born 1818)

=== 1901–present ===
- 1908 – Nozu Michitsura, Japanese field marshal (born 1840)
- 1911 – Alfred Binet, French psychologist and author (born 1857)
- 1921 – Ludwig III of Bavaria (born 1845)
- 1931 – Thomas Edison, American engineer and businessman, invented the phonograph (born 1847)
- 1931 – Lesser Ury, German painter (born 1861)
- 1934 – Santiago Ramón y Cajal, Spanish pathologist, histologist, and neuroscientist, Nobel Prize laureate (born 1852)
- 1935 – Gaston Lachaise, French-American sculptor (born 1882)
- 1941 – Manuel Teixeira Gomes, Portuguese lawyer and politician, 7th President of Portugal (born 1860)
- 1942 – Mikhail Nesterov, Russian painter (born 1862)
- 1943 – Pere Areny, Andorran convicted murderer, last person executed by Andorra (born 1913)
- 1947 – Michiaki Kamada, Japanese admiral (born 1890)
- 1948 – Walther von Brauchitsch, German field marshal (born 1881)
- 1956 – Yoshio Markino, Japanese painter and author (born 1869)
- 1959 – Boughera El Ouafi, Algerian-French runner (born 1903)
- 1961 – Tsuru Aoki, Japanese-American actress (born 1892)
- 1962 – Iván Petrovich, Serbian-German actor and singer (born 1894)
- 1965 – Henry Travers, Irish-American actor (born 1874)
- 1966 – Elizabeth Arden, Canadian-American businesswoman, founded Elizabeth Arden, Inc. (born 1878)
- 1966 – S. S. Kresge, American businessman, founded Kmart (born 1867)
- 1969 – Gyula Mándi, Hungarian footballer and manager (born 1899)
- 1973 – Margaret Caroline Anderson, American publisher, founded The Little Review (born 1886)
- 1973 – Walt Kelly, American illustrator and animator (born 1913)
- 1973 – Leo Strauss, German-American political scientist, philosopher, and academic (born 1899)
- 1975 – K. C. Douglas, American rural blues singer (born 1913)
- 1975 – Al Lettieri, American actor (born 1928)
- 1975 – Graham Haberfield, English actor (born 1941)
- 1976 – Viswanatha Satyanarayana, Indian poet and author (born 1895)
- 1977 – Andreas Baader, German militant (born 1943)
- 1977 – Gudrun Ensslin, German militant leader, founded the Red Army Faction (born 1940)
- 1978 – Ramón Mercader, Spanish journalist, assassin of Leon Trotsky (born 1914)
- 1980 – Edwin Way Teale, American photographer and author (born 1899)
- 1982 – Dwain Esper, American director and producer (born 1892)
- 1982 – Pierre Mendès France, French lawyer and politician, 143rd Prime Minister of France (born 1907)
- 1982 – John Robarts, Canadian lawyer and politician, 17th Premier of Ontario (born 1917)
- 1982 – Bess Truman, American wife of Harry S. Truman, 40th First Lady of the United States (born 1885)
- 1983 – Diego Abad de Santillán, Spanish economist and author (born 1897)
- 1983 – Willie Jones, American baseball player (born 1925)
- 1984 – Henri Michaux, French painter and poet (born 1899)
- 1987 – Adriaan Ditvoorst, Dutch director and screenwriter (born 1940)
- 2000 – Julie London, American singer and actress (born 1926)
- 2000 – Gwen Verdon, American actress and dancer (born 1925)
- 2003 – Preston Smith, American businessman and politician, 40th Governor of Texas (born 1912)
- 2003 – Manuel Vázquez Montalbán, Spanish journalist, author, and critic (born 1939)
- 2005 – Johnny Haynes, English-Scottish footballer (born 1934)
- 2005 – Bill King, American sportscaster (born 1927)
- 2006 – Mario Francesco Pompedda, Italian cardinal (born 1929)
- 2006 – Anna Russell, English-Canadian singer and actress (born 1911)
- 2006 – Laurie Taitt, Guyanese-English hurdler (born 1934)
- 2007 – Alan Coren, English journalist and author (born 1938)
- 2007 – William J. Crowe, American admiral and diplomat, United States Ambassador to the United Kingdom (born 1925)
- 2007 – Vincent DeDomenico, American businessman, founded the Napa Valley Wine Train (born 1915)
- 2007 – Lucky Dube, South African singer-songwriter and keyboard player (born 1964)
- 2008 – Dee Dee Warwick, American singer (born 1945)
- 2009 – Adriaan Kortlandt, Dutch ethologist and biologist (born 1918)
- 2009 – Nancy Spero, American painter and academic (born 1926)
- 2010 – Marion Brown, American saxophonist and musicologist (born 1931)
- 2010 – Billy Raimondi, American baseball player (born 1912)
- 2012 – Brain Damage, American wrestler (born 1977)
- 2012 – Sylvia Kristel, Dutch model and actress (born 1952)
- 2012 – Slater Martin, American basketball player and coach (born 1925)
- 2012 – George Mattos, American pole vaulter (born 1929)
- 2012 – Albert Lee Ueltschi, American pilot and businessman, founded FlightSafety International (born 1917)
- 2012 – David S. Ware, American saxophonist and composer (born 1949)
- 2013 – Tom Foley, American lawyer and politician, 57th Speaker of the United States House of Representatives (born 1929)
- 2013 – Bum Phillips, American football player and coach (born 1923)
- 2013 – Allan Stanley, Canadian ice hockey player and coach (born 1926)
- 2013 – Bill Young, American sergeant and politician (born 1930)
- 2014 – Mariano Lebrón Saviñón, Dominican author and academic (born 1922)
- 2014 – Edward Regan, American academic and politician (born 1930)
- 2014 – Sidney Shapiro, American-Chinese author and translator (born 1915)
- 2015 – Robert Dickerson, Australian painter (born 1924)
- 2015 – Gamal El-Ghitani, Egyptian journalist and author (born 1945)
- 2015 – Robert W. Farquhar, American engineer (born 1932)
- 2015 – Frank Watkins, American bass player (born 1968)
- 2015 – Paul West, English-American author, poet, and academic (born 1930)
- 2017 – Marino Perani, Italian football player and manager (born 1939)
- 2018 – Lisbeth Palme, Swedish child psychologist, former chairwoman of UNICEF (born 1931)
- 2018 – Abdel Rahman Swar al-Dahab, 5th President of the Sudan (born 1934)
- 2019 – Rui Jordão, Angolan-born Portuguese footballer (born 1952)
- 2020 – René Felber, 81st President of the Swiss Confederation (born 1933)
- 2021 – Colin Powell, American military leader and statesman, 65th Secretary of State (born 1937)
- 2022 – Harvey Wollman, American politician, 26th Governor of South Dakota (born 1935)
- 2024 – Yehuda Bauer, Israeli historian of the Holocaust (born 1926)
- 2024 – Ginés González García, Argentine politician and physician (born 1945)
- 2025 – Sam Rivers, American bassist (born 1977)
- 2025 – Yang Chen-Ning, Chinese theoretical physicist (born 1922)
- 2025 – Lia Smith, American diver and transgender rights advocate.

== Holidays and observances ==
- Alaska Day (Alaska, United States)
- Christian feast day:
  - Asclepiades of Antioch
  - Isaac Jogues
  - Luke the Evangelist
  - Monon
  - Peter of Alcantara, can also be celebrated on October 19.
  - October 18 (Eastern Orthodox liturgics)
- Day of Restoration of Independence (Azerbaijan), celebrates the independence of Azerbaijan from the Soviet Union in 1991.
- Necktie Day (Croatia)
- Persons Day (Canada)
