= Roscoe Jackson =

Last person to be publicly executed in the U.S. (1901–1937)

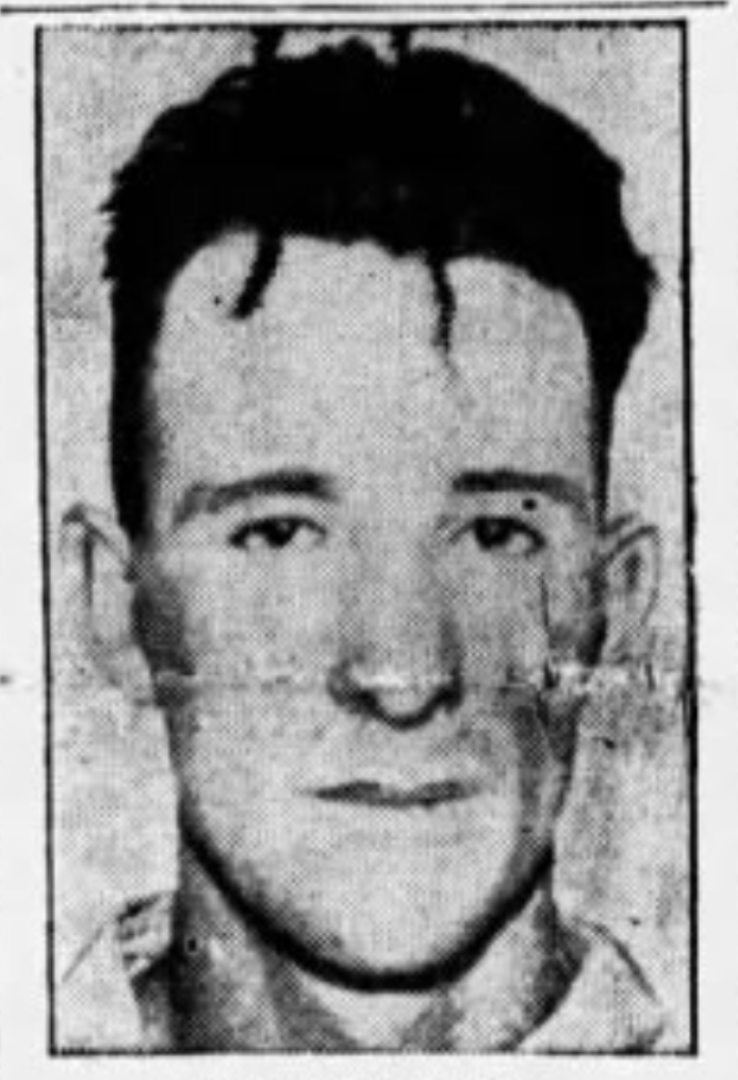
- Mug shot of Jackson, c. 1937
- Born: May 11, 1901; Howards Ridge, Missouri, U.S.
- Died: May 21, 1937 (aged 36); Galena, Missouri, U.S.
- Resting place: Howards Ridge, Missouri, U.S.
- Known for: Being the final person to be publicly executed in the U.S.
- Status: Executed
- Conviction: First degree murder
- Penalty: Death

Roscoe Jackson (May 11, 1901 – May 21, 1937) was an American criminal who was the last person to be publicly executed in the United States. (Note: Other sources have pointed to Rainey Bethea as the last publicly executed person in the United States.) Jackson, a habitual criminal, confessed to the murder of Pearl Bozarth, a traveling salesman, with the motive being robbery, as Jackson had stolen Bozarth's money and car. Jackson was convicted of Bozarth's murder and hanged in Galena, Missouri.

== Early life ==
Roscoe Jackson was born in Howards Ridge, Missouri, on May 11, 1901, to Andrew J. and Matilda (Kyle) Jackson. As the eldest son, Roscoe worked on the family farm with his father until he was 17 years old. He then left home and lost contact with his family as he drifted westward across the country.

Jackson married Dona Ellison, a native of Howards Ridge, and had four children with her, all of whom were still young at the time of Jackson's execution. By the time of Jackson's death, he and Ellison were estranged, and she and the couple's four children had moved to Pauls Valley, Oklahoma.

Jackson's first run-in with the law came as a teenager. Jackson and another boy fought over a girl, with Jackson on the losing end. Afterwards, Jackson began carrying a gun and bragging about it, which resulted in his arrest and conviction of illegally carrying a concealed weapon. During one of Jackson's stints in the Ozark County jail, Jackson saw another man's dog and called it over to his cell, after which Jackson doused the dog with an accelerant, tossed a lit match onto the dog, and set it on fire. The dog ran away and accidentally set fire to a hotel building before a citizen killed the dog with a shotgun to "end its misery". This incident earned Jackson a reputation in the area as a "brutal man".

== Crime and arrest ==
On August 2, 1934, while hitchhiking in Branson, Jackson was picked up by Pearl Bozarth, the owner of a poultry medicine factory located in St. Louis, who had been traveling through the area selling poultry medication at the time. Bozarth gave Jackson a lift, and the men stopped in Forsyth for the evening. There, Bozarth paid for Jackson to have a meal and paid for his lodging for the night at Shadow Rock Camp.

Three days later, a local farmer found Bozarth's body in a field between Bradleyville and Brownbranch; his car and money were gone. His cause of death was likely multiple bullet wounds to the head. Bozarth's remains were taken by Forsyth police officers and Taney County Coroner Bob Thornhill to Branson. Remaining on his person was a watch, a ring, and 95 cents.

The owner of Shadow Rock Camp was W.G. Reed, a longtime friend of Bozarth. Reed told the investigators of the hitchhiker who was with Bozarth at the camp. Reed and a local filling station attendant gave descriptions of Jackson to the investigators that helped in Jackson's apprehension.

Investigators received a tip from Wewoka, Oklahoma, that a man matching their suspect's description was in their town. Taney County Sheriff Bill Pumphrey and Prosecuting Attorney Joe Gideon traveled from Forsyth to Wewoka to attempt to apprehend Bozarth's murderer. Jackson was captured at the home of Anna Whitten. He was still in possession of Bozarth's vehicle, though he had attempted to disguise it by painting it; the investigators discovered buckets of black paint that Jackson had used to paint the vehicle.

When authorities returned Jackson to Forsyth, Reed positively identified him as the man who was with Bozarth. Jackson admitted to riding with Bozarth but insisted that there was another passenger, a man by the name of William Young, who committed the murder and forced Jackson to ride with him to Seminole, Oklahoma.

== Trial ==
Although the murder took place in Taney County, Missouri, the case was moved to Stone County, Missouri, on a change of venue.

The trial began on December 10, 1934, with jury selection and voir dire, although witnesses were not called to the stand until 3:00 pm. The next day, at 12:00 pm, the jurors began deliberation.

The jury found Jackson guilty of first-degree murder, but they could not agree on the punishment. Judge Robert Gideon called in the jury after two hours of deliberation, and discovered that nine of the jurors were for the death penalty and three were for life imprisonment. After the jury explained to Judge Gideon that they would not be able to come to an agreement, they were dismissed; Judge Gideon then sentenced Jackson to death.

After being convicted, Jackson confessed to the murder of Bozarth. He also confessed to murdering another man in Oklahoma.

Jackson was taken to the state penitentiary in Jefferson City where he was held in solitary confinement for over two years.

== Execution ==
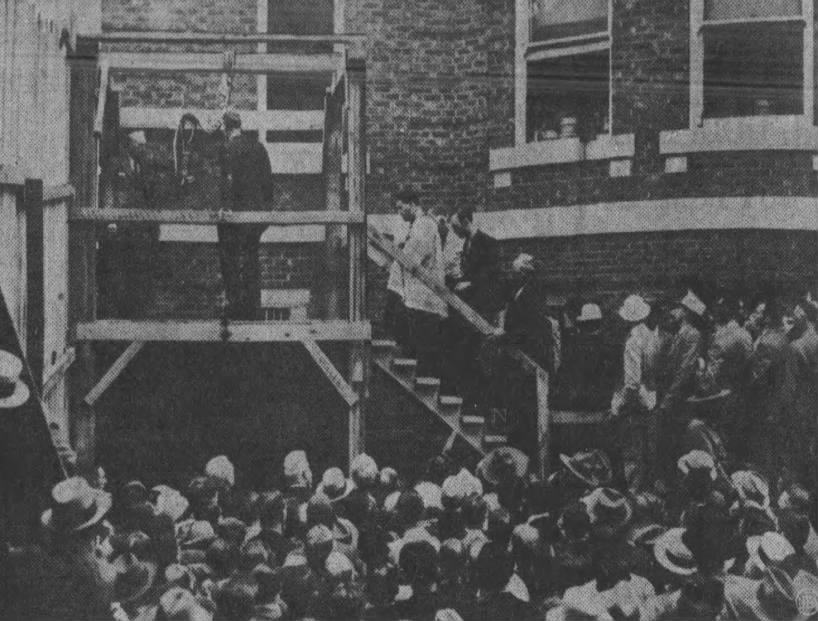
Roscoe Jackson walking the steps of the gallows

On May 20, 1937, Stone County Sheriff I. H. Coin, Deputy F. A. Moore, Taney County Sheriff Henry Simmons and Harvey George of the Missouri Highway Patrol traveled to Jefferson City to collect Jackson for the execution.

One of the witnesses to the hanging was Howard Bozarth, the son of the murder victim Pearl Bozarth. Jackson's father, Andrew J. Jackson, had made the trip from Howard's Ridge, near Gainesville, Missouri, for his son's execution, although he did not witness the hanging. While his father visited him in the county jail, Roscoe told his father, "What a man sows, that shall he also reap, and I am prepared to reap my harvest in the morning."

The next morning, a few minutes before six o'clock, it is estimated that at least 400 people were waiting outside the courthouse to witness Jackson's hanging. After the spectators had filed into the enclosure, Sheriff Coin quieted the crowd. On the runway was Father Ahern, Jackson's spiritual advisor, followed by Jackson. Ahern read aloud the Act of Contrition, and Jackson repeated the words. Jackson turned to face the crowd that was outside of the enclosure, and said:

To ask anyone to forgive me is too much. Death itself is not so bad, but the record a person leaves behind him may be. To die accidentally is easy, but when you come to it gradually, it is hard. If you feel I am paying my debt like a man I am glad.

He then turned to face the crowd in the enclosure and was placed in the center of the trap. Deputy Moore placed the black hood over his face, Sheriff Simmons placed the noose around his neck, while other officers strapped his legs together. Jackson then raised his hands and said, "Well, be good, folks." Sheriff Coin pulled the lever, and Jackson fell 10 feet (3 meters). Ten minutes later, he was pronounced dead by physicians Homer L. Kerr of Crane and L. S. Shumate of Reeds Spring.

== Aftermath ==
Following Jackson's execution, after officials removed Jackson's body from the gallows, a crowd remained close to the enclosure where the hanging had taken place; souvenir hunters cut off pieces of the rope.

Jackson's father, Andrew Jackson, did not watch the execution. While the St. Louis Post-Dispatch reported that Jackson's father waited in the sheriff's office until the execution was completed so he could take Jackson's body to Howards Ridge, the West Plains Weekly Quill reported that Jackson's father returned home and left Jackson's attorney, G.W. Rogers, to take charge of the body. Jackson's father, mother, and siblings attended his funeral; his estranged wife and children did not. Afterwards, Jackson was laid to rest in Howards Ridge.

=== Missouri's change from hanging to the gas chamber ===
In September 1937, Governor Lloyd Crow Stark signed a bill that exclusively authorized the use of lethal gas for Missouri's executions moving forward. Three men were hanged in the state in 1937 prior to Governor Stark's bill, those being Fred Adams in Callaway County, on April 2, 1937; Dudley Barr on the same date and at the same time as Jackson's execution (albeit inside the Jackson County courthouse), at 6:00 am on May 21, 1937; and Roscoe Jackson. Barr and Jackson were the last people hanged in Missouri, and the state carried out its first gas chamber execution on March 4, 1938. In total, Missouri used the gas chamber on eight men in 1938.
