= Bruderkrieg =

Bruderkrieg (German for "brother war") may refer to:

- Saxon Brother War, 1446–1451
- Austro-Prussian War, 1866
- The Anarchist Bruderkrieg, 1883–1888

== See also ==
- Brothers War (disambiguation)
- Fratricide
