= Brothers War =

Brothers War may refer to:

- The Brothers' War (241-227 BC) between Antiochus Hierax and Seleucus II Callinicus in the Seleucid Empire
- The War of the Two Brothers (1828–1834) in Portugal
- The Austro-Prussian War of 1866
- The War of Brothers of 1988–1990 in Lebanon
- The Battle of Gaza (2007) between Hamas and Fatah
- The World War One/The Great War (1914–1918)
- The Brothers' War, a 2022 Magic: The Gathering expansion set

== See also ==
- Bruderkrieg (disambiguation)
- Fratricide
