= Public execution =

Capital punishment carried out in public view

Execution of Louis XVI, copperplate engraving, 1793

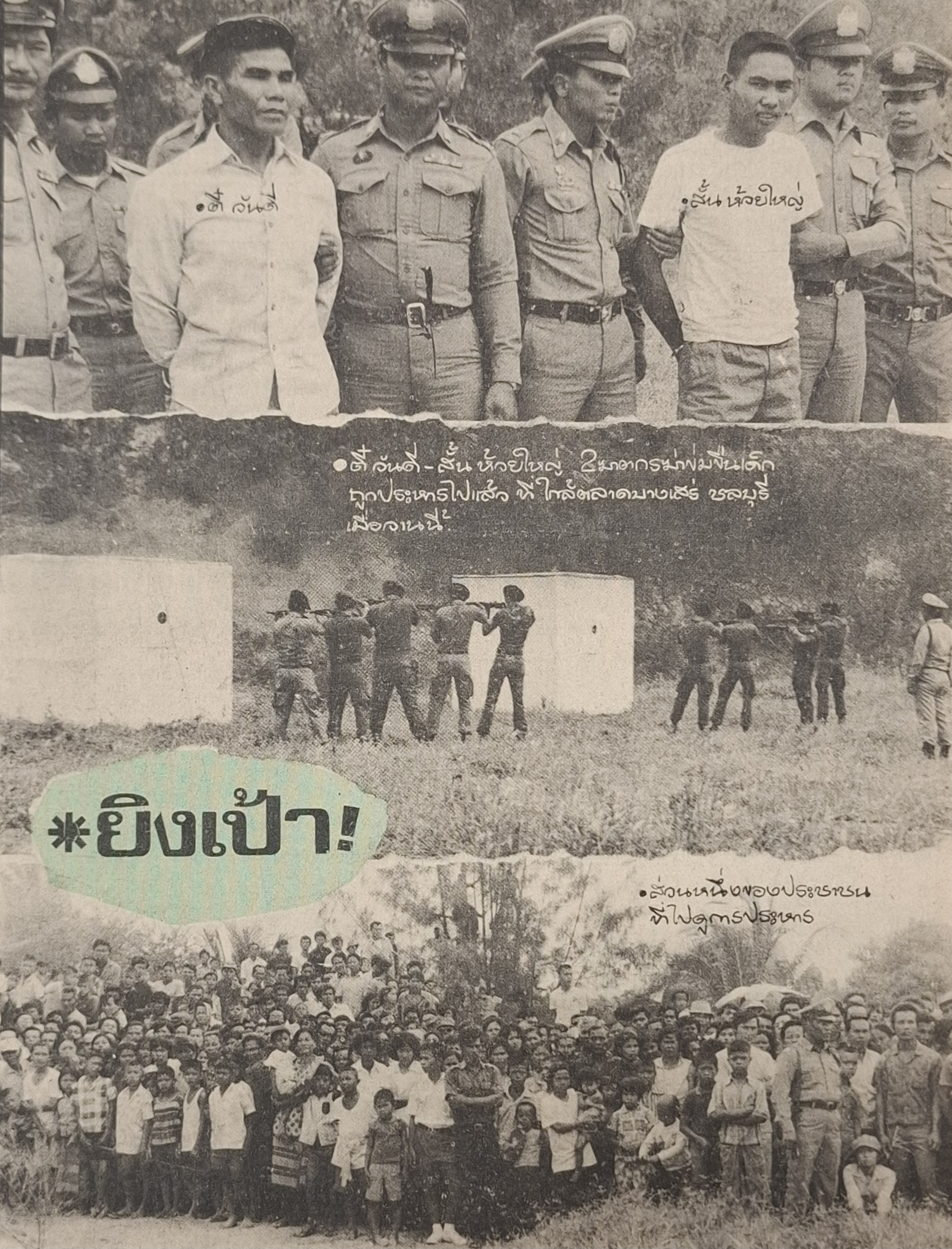
Public firing squad of Tee Wandee and San Huayai at Banphotkhiri Hill, Sattahip district, Chonburi province on August 30, 1972

A public execution is a form of capital punishment which may be attended by the general public. This definition excludes the presence of only a small number of witnesses called upon to assure executive accountability. The purpose of such displays has historically been to deter individuals from defying laws or authorities. Attendance at such events was historically encouraged and sometimes even mandatory.

Most countries have abolished capital punishment, or retain it in law but have ceased in practice. While today most countries regard public executions with distaste, they have been practised nearly everywhere at some point in history. At many points in the past, public executions were preferred to executions behind closed doors because of their supposed deterrence. However, the actual efficacy of this form of terror is disputed. They also allowed the convicted the opportunity to make a final speech, gave the state the chance to display its power in front of those who fell under its jurisdiction, and granted the public what was considered to be a great spectacle. Public executions also permitted the state to project its superiority over political opponents.

== Ancient era ==
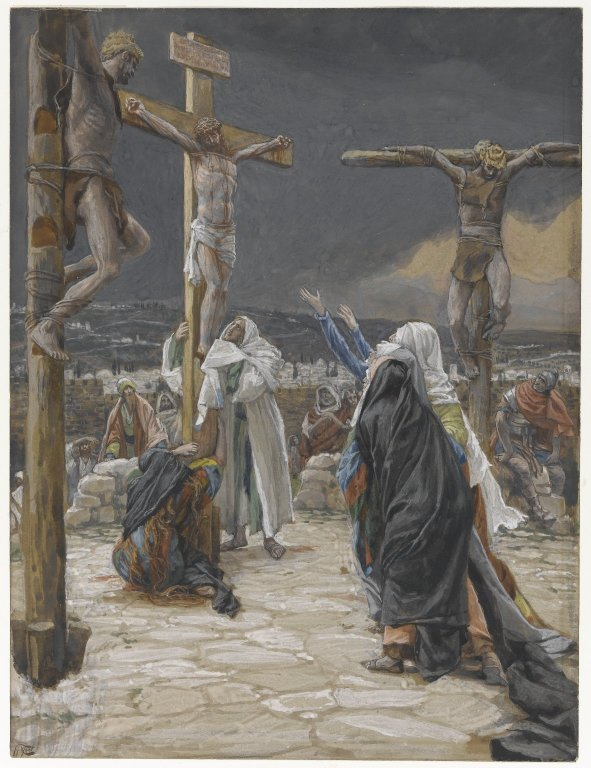
The Crucifixion of Jesus, as depicted by James Tissot

People were crucified in ancient Macedonia, Persia, Jerusalem, Phoenicia, Rome, and Carthage.

=== China ===
Public executions were common in China from at least the Tang Dynasty.

== Medieval period ==
=== Medieval Europe ===
Documented public executions date back to at least the late medieval period, and peaked in the later sixteenth century. This peak was due in part to the witch trials of the early modern period. In the late Middle Ages, executioners used increasingly brutal methods designed to inflict pain on the victim while still alive and to generate a spectacle in order to deter others from committing crimes. The cruelty of the mode of execution (including the amount victims were tortured before the actual execution) was also more or less extreme depending on the crime itself. Punishments often invoked the "purifying" powers of earth (burial), water (drowning), and fire (burning alive). Victims were also decapitated, quartered, hanged, and beaten. Bodies or body parts were often displayed in public places and authorities took pains to ensure that remains would stay visible for as long as possible.

However, the death penalty was not used in all parts of Europe. Vladimir the Great abolished the death penalty in Kievan Rus' following his conversion to Christianity in 988.

== Modern period ==
=== Africa ===
==== Liberia ====
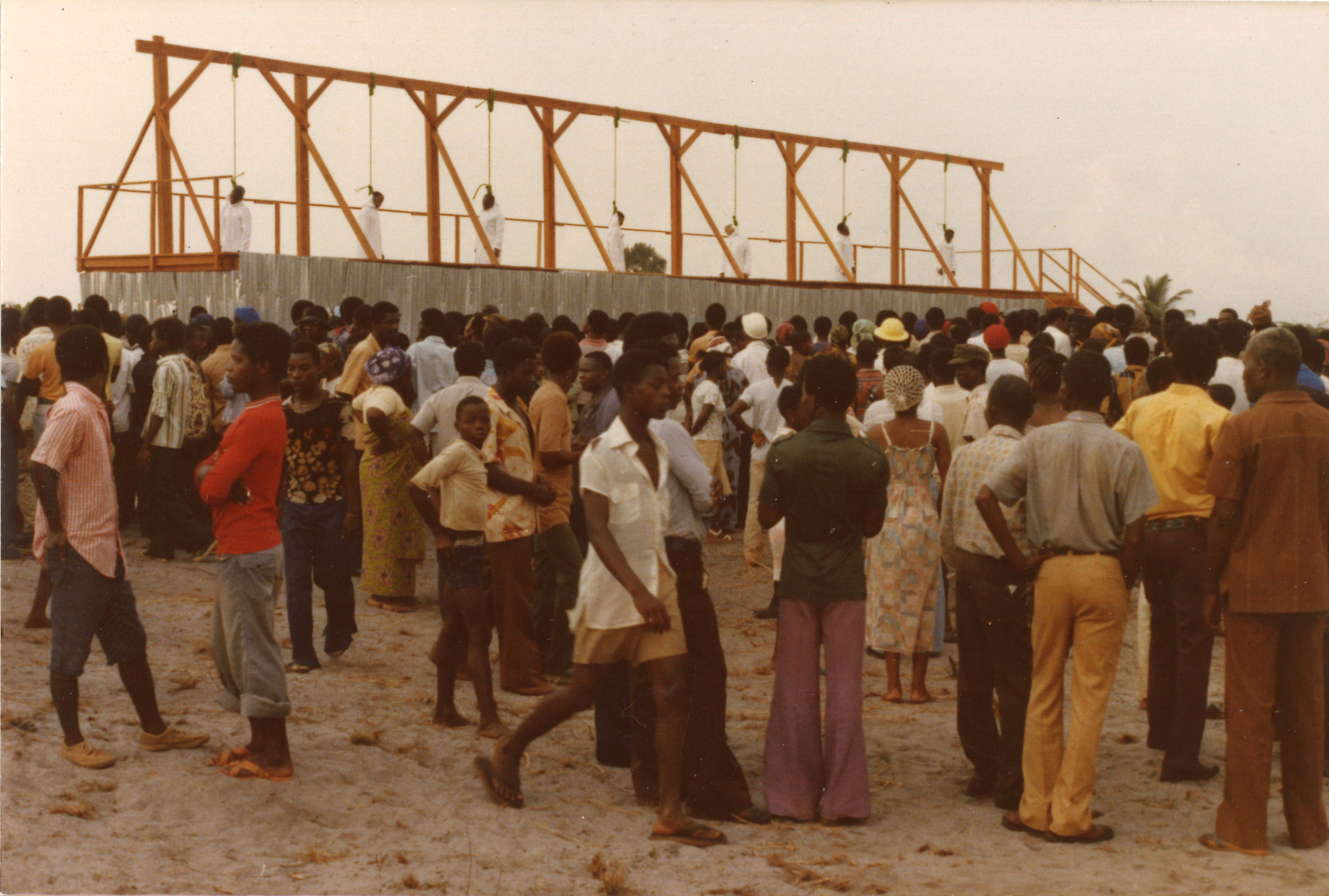
The public hanging of the Harper Seven in Liberia in 1979

During the 1970s, Liberian president William Tolbert used public hangings as a deterrent against crime, with sixteen convicted murderers hanged between 1971 and 1979. The public execution of the Harper Seven in 1979 over a series of witchcraft-related ritual murders attracted particular attention.

==== Somalia ====
The military publicly executed several people in 2018.

=== Asia ===
==== Afghanistan ====
The first Taliban regime performed public executions, including shooting a woman in a sports stadium in 1999. Public executions resumed after the 2021 Taliban offensive, with six public executions in 2025.

==== Iran ====
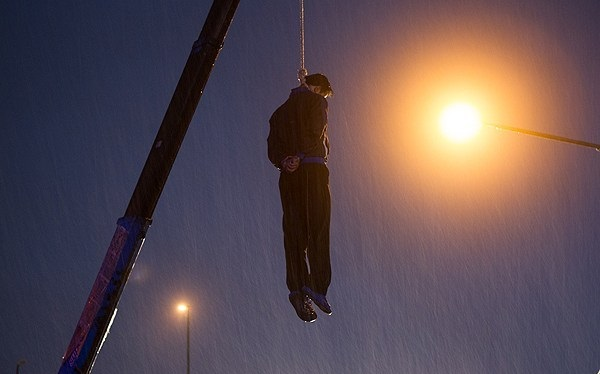
2013 public hanging of the murderer Ali Mohammadzadeh in Iran

Since the Islamic Revolution in 1979, public executions in Iran have been commonplace. Prisoners are often lifted by a crane high off the ground with a rope around their neck, resulting in strangulation. There have also been recorded cases of stoning.

==== Kuwait ====
Kuwait has sometimes executed people in public. The prisoners are taken to the gallows and once a senior police officer gives the signed warrant, the prisoners are hanged.

==== Saudi Arabia ====
Until recently, Saudi Arabia carried out frequent public executions, usually by beheading for males and firing squads for females. In 1992, Amnesty International reported 105 public executions, often in what has been dubbed Chop-Chop Square. Defendants did not have the right to a lawyer before or during their trial, were sentenced based on confessions obtained by torture, and under a system without a written penal or code of criminal procedure.

According to eyewitness journalist Adam St. Patrick, by 2009 the overall process had become less public. Corpses were displayed much less often, beheadings were no longer a scheduled weekly occurrence, and the event attracted fewer people and excitement than years prior. Patrick documented a nonchalant execution lasting only ten minutes and involving less than a dozen people. The defendants' crimes were read into a loudspeaker.

In 2008 and 2015, secret recordings of executions were released on the internet.

Recently execution practices have become more secretive and a public execution has not been documented in several years.

=== Europe ===
During the seventeenth century, the use of premortem torture decreased; instead bodies were desecrated after death and for display purposes. By the beginning of the eighteenth century, the number of capital punishments in Western Europe had fallen by about 85% from the previous century as the legal system shifted toward one that considered human rights as well as a more rational approach to criminal justice that centered around identifying the best methods for deterrence. However, there were several resurgences throughout the eighteenth and nineteenth centuries, especially during times of social unrest. Executions were condemned by eighteenth-century Enlightenment thinkers like Jeremy Bentham and Cesare Beccaria. Enlightenment thinkers were not universally opposed to public executions—many anatomists found executions useful because they supplied healthy body parts to study and experiment on. People also found postmortem torture (which was typically part of a public execution) disrespectful to the dead and believed that it could prevent the victim from getting into heaven.

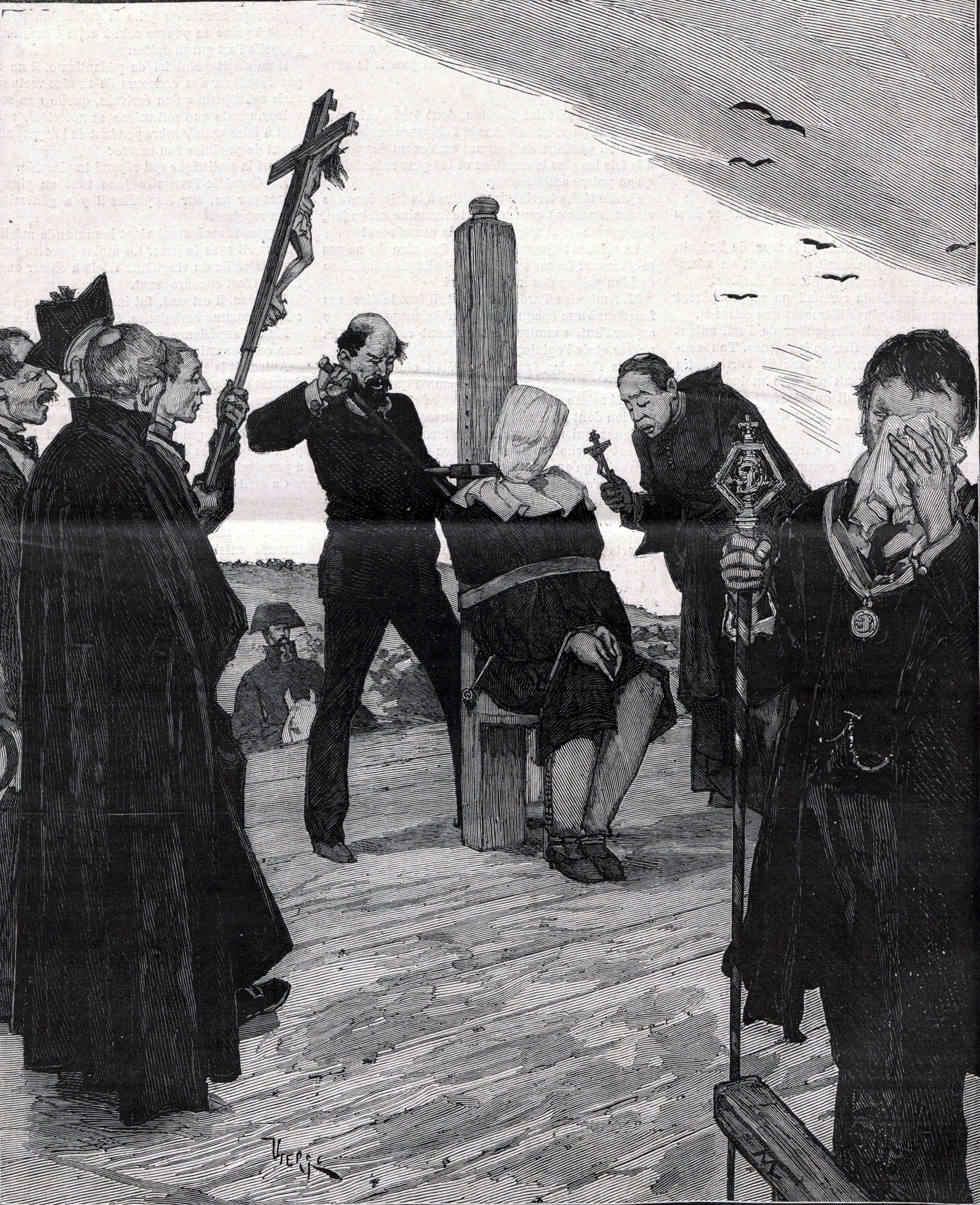
Public garroting of 23-year-old Juan Oliva Moncusí, on 4 January 1879 at the Campo de Guardias in Madrid, for having attempted to assassinate the King of Spain Alfonso XII

The first modern abolition of capital punishment was in Tuscany in 1786.

In Europe, the 19th and early 20th centuries saw a shift away from the spectacle of public capital punishment and toward private executions and the deprivation of liberty (e.g. incarceration, probation, community service, etc.). This coincided with a general tendency to shield all death from public view.

==== Andorra ====
On 18 October 1943, Andorra carried out its last execution by putting convicted murderer Pere Areny to death by firing squad. Areny had been convicted in a fast-track trial of the fratricide of his 56-year-old half-brother two months earlier. The execution took place in front of residents of Canillo, where the crime occurred, and became the last execution carried out by Andorra before the country abolished the death penalty in 1990.

==== France ====
In France, authorities continued public executions until 1939. Executions were made private after a secret film of serial killer Eugen Weidmann's death by guillotine emerged and scandalized the process. Disturbing reports emerged of spectators soaking up Weidmann's blood in rags for souvenirs, and in response President Albert Lebrun banned public executions in France for "promoting baser instincts of human nature."

==== Germany ====
Nazi Germany utilized public execution by hanging, shooting, and decapitation.

==== United Kingdom ====
In London, those sentenced to death at the Old Bailey would remain at Newgate Prison and wait for their sentences to be carried out in the street. As at Tyburn, the crowds who would come to watch continued to be large and unruly. The last public execution (hanging) in Great Britain was that of Michael Barrett outside Newgate Prison, London, on 26 May 1868. The last public execution in Ireland was that of John Logue at Downpatrick in 1866.

Frances Larson wrote in her 2014 book Severed: A History of Heads Lost and Heads Found:

For as long as there were public executions, there were crowds to see them. In London in the early 19th century, there might have been 5,000 to watch a standard hanging, but crowds of up to 100,000 came to see a famous felon killed. The numbers hardly changed over the years.

==== Post-World War II ====
Public executions have been largely abolished in Europe since the end of the Second World War in 1945. Notable postwar public executions include:

- The Kiev trials of January 1946 saw 12 Nazi officers and collaborators convicted of mass murder and hanged in Maidan Nezalezhnosti, Kyiv.
- Einsatzgruppen leader Friedrich Jeckeln was publicly hanged in Riga on 3 February 1946.
- Karl Hermann Frank, police commander in the Protectorate of Bohemia and Moravia; hanged in Prague on 22 May 1946 before 5,000 people.
- On 4 July 1946, 11 guards from the Stutthof trials were publicly hanged at the hill of Biskupia Górka outside Gdańsk; 4 of the hanged were women.
- Arthur Greiser, leader of Wartheland under the Nazi regime, and responsible for the Holocaust in the region, and the mass murder of large numbers of Poles. He was sentenced to death by the Polish Supreme National Tribunal and publicly hanged in Poznań on 21 July 1946, before 15,000 witnesses.
- In Turkey, public executions continued to take place throughout the 1950s, with hangings in Sultanahmet Square, Istanbul; the last public execution in Istanbul was in 1960, in Eminönü Square; the body was left hanging for five hours.
- On 25 December 1989, Romanian dictator Nicolae Ceaușescu and his wife Elena were sentenced to death by the National Salvation Front; their execution was recorded by a Romanian television crew and was broadcast in the following days.
- Europe's last public execution to date took place in Fier, Albania, on 25 June 1992; Dritëbardh Çuko and Josif Çuko were hanged 27 days after committing the Libofshë massacre, a bungled robbery in which they murdered a family of five.

=== North America ===
==== El Salvador ====
The last execution carried by El Salvador was a public and televised execution by firing squad in San Miguel. The prisoner, 28-year-old peasant and bandit Victoriano Gómez Urrutia, had been convicted of the January 1961 murders of a mother and her underage daughter during a robbery committed in a district of San Miguel Department.

==== United States ====
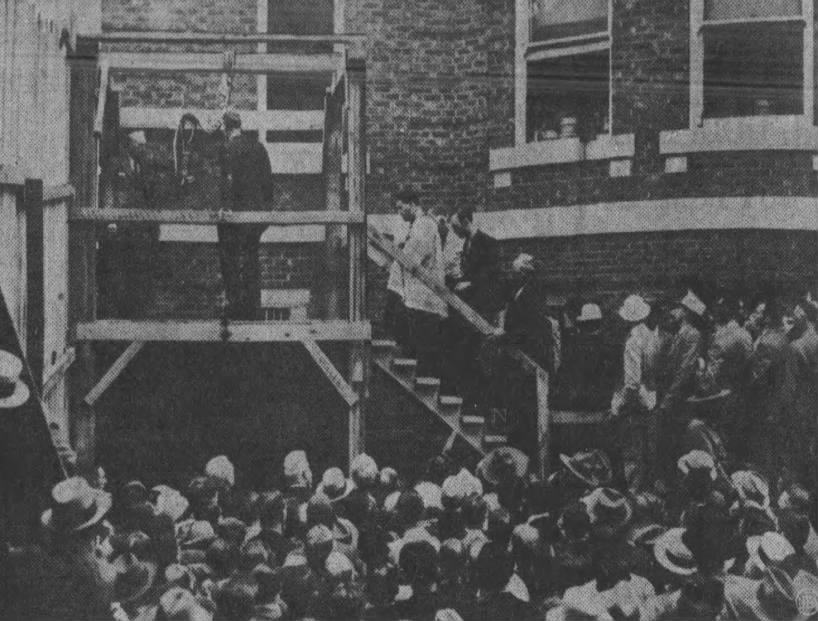
Roscoe Jackson, the last person publicly executed in the United States, approaches the gallows

State legislatures began placing restrictions on public attendance at executions in the 19th century. In 1830, Connecticut became the first U.S. state to require executions occur in private. In 1890, the U.S. Supreme Court ruled in Holden v. Minnesota that state laws limiting the number of witnesses at executions and restricting subsequent reporting were constitutionally permissible. The hanging of William Carr in 1897 was the first filmed execution.

The 1937 hanging of convicted murderer Roscoe Jackson in Galena, Missouri, has been cited as the last state-sanctioned public execution in the United States. A year earlier, the widely publicised hanging of Rainey Bethea took place in Owensboro, Kentucky, with an estimated 20,000 people in attendance. It has been argued some executions later in the 20th century may meet certain definitions of "public executions", as members of the general public were allowed to apply to witness the event without restriction. In 1977, Utah's execution by firing squad of convicted murderer Gary Gilmore was attended by around 40 people.

In the late 20th century and early 21st century, several media outlets unsuccessfully sought to broadcast executions either on television or on the internet. Both state supreme courts and U.S. courts of appeal have consistently held there is no constitutionally protected right to record or broadcast an execution. High-profile attempts to televise executions have included KQED's efforts to broadcast the 1992 execution of Robert Alton Harris and convicted murderer David Lawson's efforts to have his 1994 execution broadcast on The Phil Donahue Show. In Entertainment Network Inc. v Lappin (2001), a U.S. District Court rejected an application to webcast the execution of Oklahoma City bomber Timothy McVeigh and upheld the constitutionality of Federal Bureau of Prisons regulations banning recording or broadcasting executions to the public. However, McVeigh's lethal injection was screened via closed-circuit television to accommodate the large numbers of his victims' family members wishing to view his death.

On October 8, 2026, Pentagon officials announced that the execution by firing squad of Nidal Hasan, the perpetrator of the 2009 Fort Hood shooting, will be livestreamed. After bipartisan backlash, on October 15, U.S. President Donald Trump announced that the public execution was cancelled, but the execution will still happen privately by December 3.

=== Oceania ===
==== Australia ====
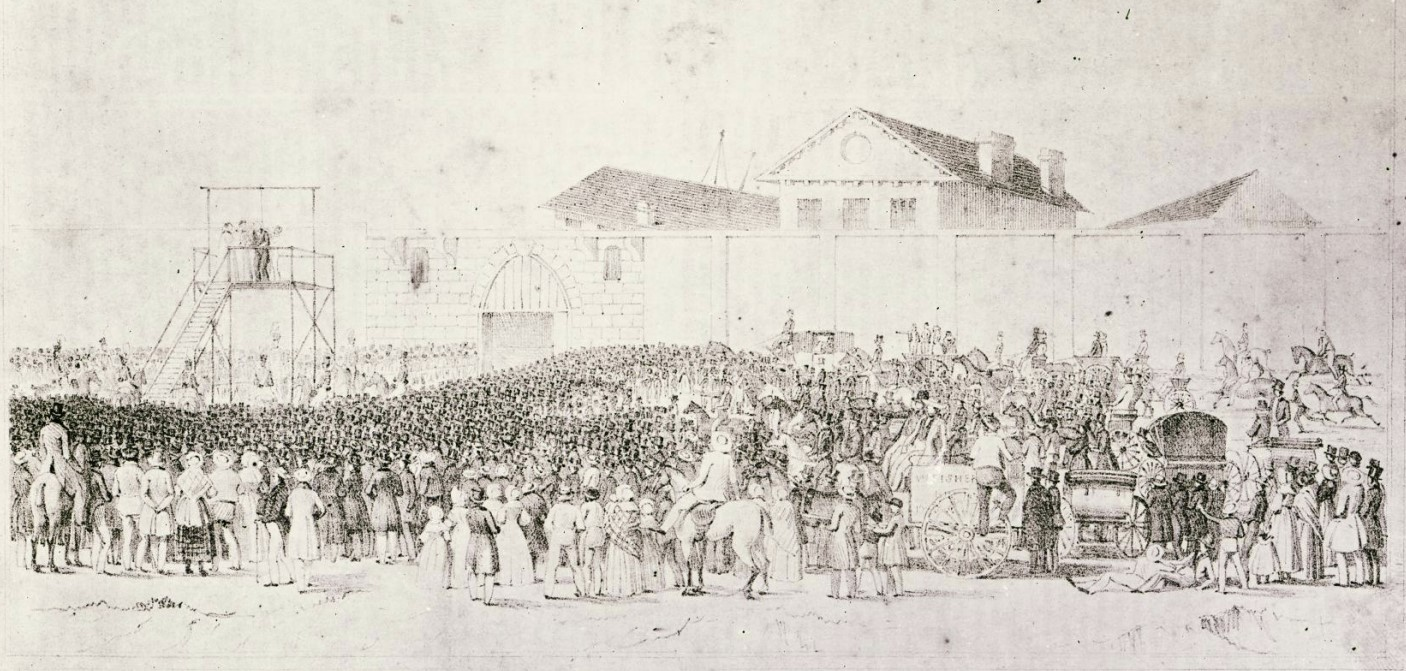
Illustration of the public execution of convicted murderer John Knatchbull in Sydney in 1844

During the Australian colonial period, public executions continued until the second half of the 19th century, largely coinciding with the end of the convict era. They were abolished by the colonies of New South Wales (including present-day Queensland), Van Diemen's Land (present-day Tasmania) and Victoria in 1855, by South Australia in 1858, and by Western Australia in 1871. Public executions of Indigenous offenders continued in some jurisdictions in violation of the legislation.

In South Australia and Western Australia, public executions were subsequently reintroduced solely for Indigenous Australian offenders, in 1861 and 1875 respectively, on the basis that they were needed as a deterrent against frontier violence against white settlers. The last public execution in Western Australia took place in February 1892, where three Indigenous men convicted of murder were hanged at the scene of the crime near Halls Creek, Western Australia, in front of around 70 witnesses. The legislation allowing for public executions for Indigenous offenders was not formally abolished until 1952 in Western Australia and 1971 in South Australia, although those provisions had been long considered dormant.

==== New Zealand ====
Public executions were abolished in New Zealand by the Executions of Criminals Act 1858, which specified that executions had to be carried out "within the walls or the enclosed yard of some gaol, or within some other enclosed space". The act came into force on 3 June 1858, three months after the country's last public hanging in central Auckland.

==== Papua New Guinea ====
In the Australian-administered Territory of New Guinea, legally a League of Nations mandate after 1920, public executions were used as a "tool of government". In 1933, a district officer reported that two executions in New Britain had been carried out before crowds of hundreds of people, and that "execution of the murderers on the spot has done much to make these natives fall in with the wishes of the government".

Following the Japanese occupation of New Guinea, 22 New Guinean civilians convicted of collaboration offences – members of the Orokaiva people – were publicly executed by the Australian New Guinea Administrative Unit (ANGAU) in 1943 and 1944. The hangings were intended as a deterrent against other prospective collaborationists, with the offenders "hung two at a time from early in the morning until late in the afternoon in front of thousands of local people".

== See also ==
- Outline of capital punishment
- Public executions in Iran
- Public executions in North Korea
