= Zhanna Aghamiryan =

Armenian curator

- Ժաննա Աղամիրյան
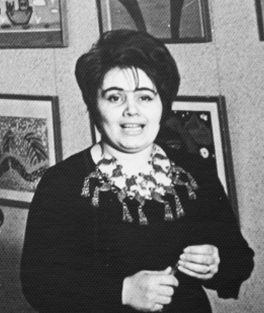
- Born: 1936
- Died: 1975 (aged 38–39)
- Known for: Director of Children's Art Museum, Yerevan

Zhanna Aghamiryan (Armenian: Ժաննա Աղամիրյան; 1936 -1975) was an Armenian artist, art critic, teacher, founder and the first director of Yerevan Children's Gallery, the world (and the Soviet Union's) first children's art museum. Her work at the museum established an artistic education for many artists, such as Sergey Rubenyan. The gallery was founded in 1970 by Aghamiryan and her husband Henrik Igityan; in 1978 it was renamed the Children's Art Museum. This later became part of the National Centre for Aesthetics. She died in a plane crash.

== Selected works ==
- Детская картинная галерея [Children's Art Gallery] (1979)
