= Howards Ridge, Missouri =

Unincorporated community in Missouri, U.S.

Coordinates: 36°31′44″N 92°19′56″W

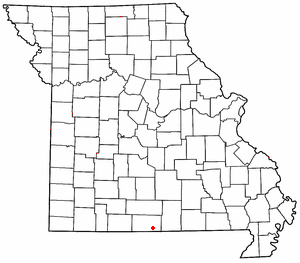

Howards Ridge is an unincorporated community in southeastern Ozark County in the southern Missouri Ozarks, United States. It is located seven miles southeast of Gainesville and 2.15 miles north of the Arkansas border, at the intersection of Ozark County routes J and T. The community is at an elevation of 880 feet and lies two and a half miles west of Norfork Lake.

Howards Ridge was served by a U.S. Post Office from 1905 to 1978. The community has the name of the Howard family which settled a nearby ridge.
