= Henrik Igityan National Centre for Aesthetics =

Center of aesthetic education for children

Coordinates: 40.1834°N 44.5181°E

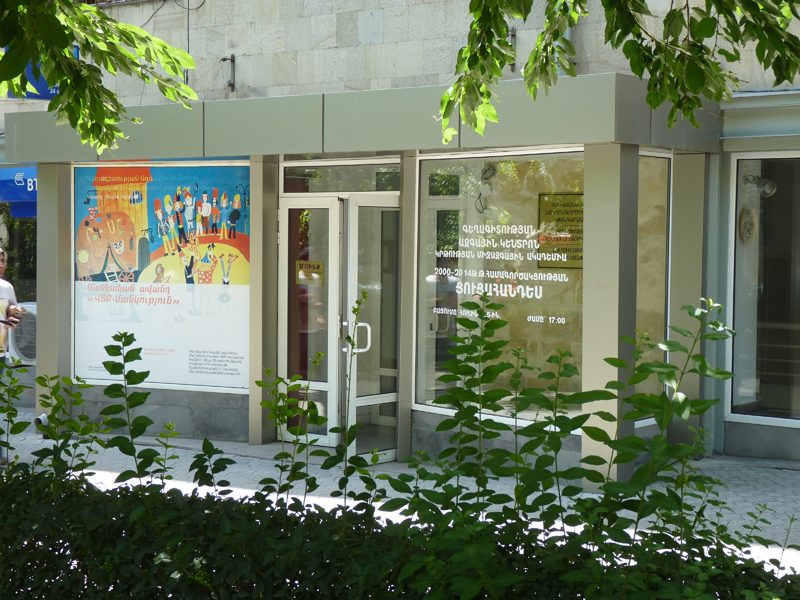
- Former name: Children's Art Museum
- Established: October 18, 1978
- Location: Yerevan
- Type: Arts centre
- Founder: Henrik Igityan
- Director: Vahan Badalyan
- Website: nca.am/en

Henrik Igityan National Centre for Aesthetics (NCA) (Armenian: Գեղագիտության ազգային կենտրոն) is a gallery and museum in Yerevan, Armenia. It was based on, and as of 2024 includes, the Children's Art Museum, which was founded in 1970 by Henrik Igityan and Zhanna Aghamiryan.

== Background ==
The National Centre for Aesthetics in Yerevan was established on 18 October 1978. In 2016, the NCA formally adopted 'Henrik Igityan' as part of its name. In 2020, Vahan Badalyan was appointed Director. It was based on, and as of 2024 includes, the Children's Art Museum, which was founded in 1970 by Henrik Igityan (hy) and Zhanna Aghamiryan.

== Programming ==
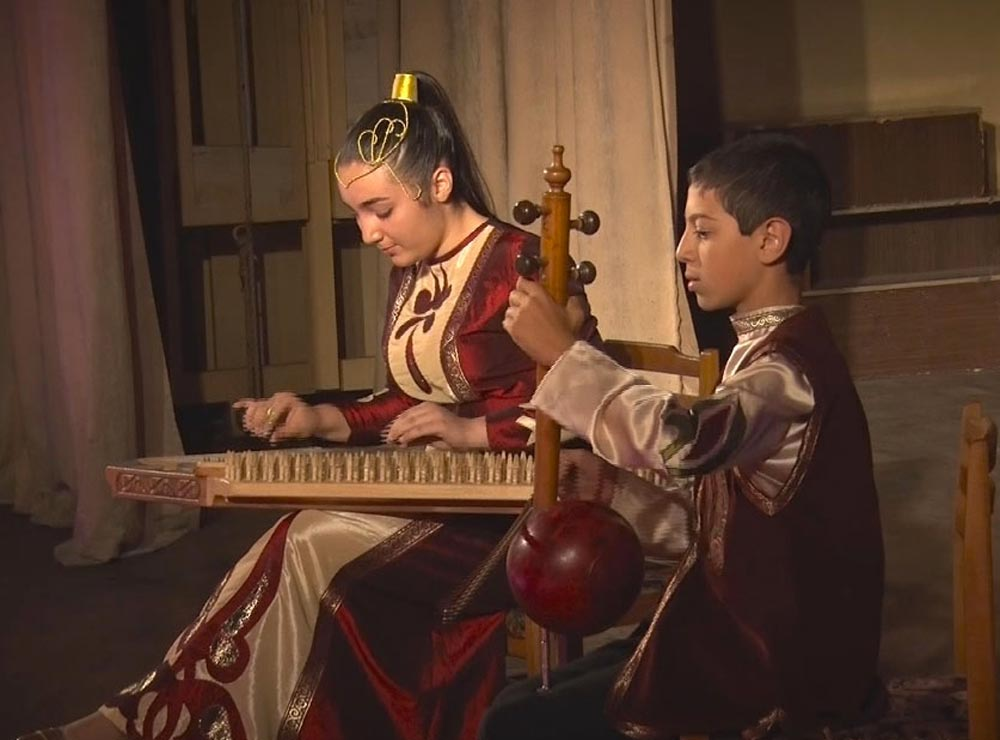
Music school of NCA

The NCA has fine and decorative art studios, theatres, an orchestra and dance studio. There are branches of the NCA in cities beyond Yerevan, including in Goris, Gyumri, Meghri and Vanadzor. Each branch has the opportunity to reflect local culture, focusing on materials of the locality or specific folk art practices. It also encourages inclusive contemporary dance performances.

In 2010, the NCA celebrated the 2150th anniversary of Tigranes the Great, exhibiting works of artists from Nagorno-Karabakh. In 2017, Armenian-Iranian culture was celebrated through an exhibition of works by the Iranian artists Dariush Mohammadkhani, Ali-Mohammad Masiha, Shahriar Hojjati and Fatemeh Rahimi-Yeganeh. In 2021, the center exhibited work by child refugees from the Republic of Artsakh. In 2022, another exhibition celebrated Henrik Igityan's 90th birthday.

== Children's Art Museum ==
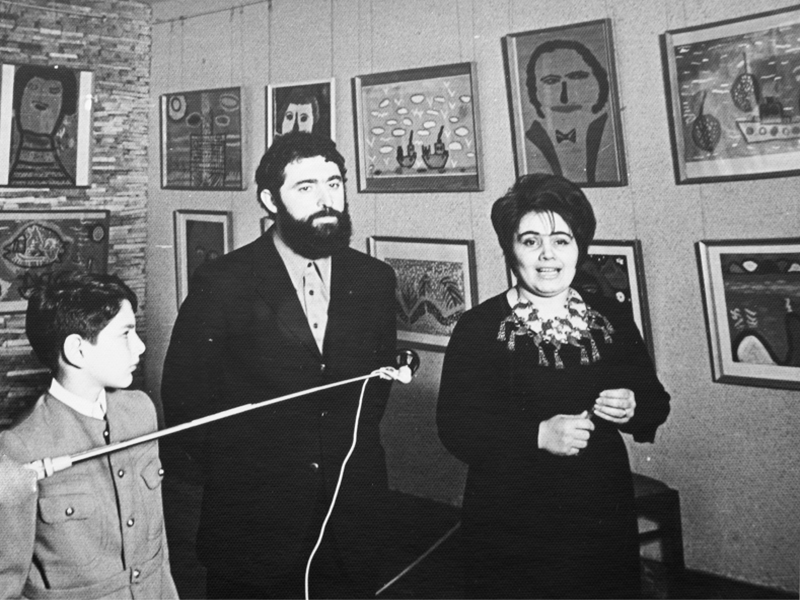
Igityan and Aghamiryan at the Children's Art Museum opening ceremony in 1970

The Children's Art Museum was established in 1970 as Armenia's first children's art museum. Zhanna Aghamiryan was the first director.

=== Collection ===
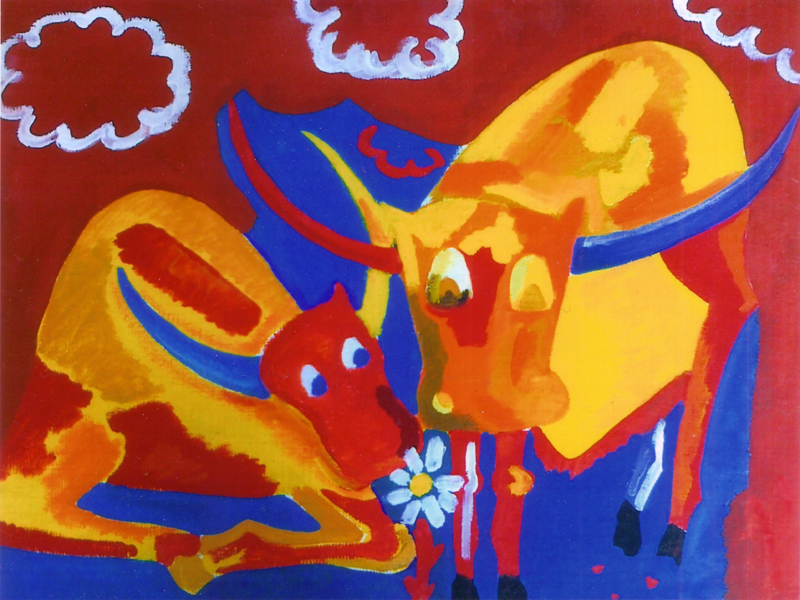
Work of Ruben Igityan, son of Igityan and Aghamiryan

The children's art collection includes over 150,000 works of art created by children from around the world, from 120 countries. The collection is divided into national, former USSR states and international. Some works in the collection are considered masterpieces of children's art, for example gouache work by Armen Khachaturya. In 1986 the gallery exhibited works by ten-year-old Tigran Tsitoghdzyan, which subsequently toured as an exhibition to America, Russia, Japan and Spain.

Works by child artists were exhibited in both group and individual shows. In 1983 the first exhibition of children's metalwork was opened. In 1984 to apply for a solo show, the artist had to be between the ages of 3 and 16. Writing in 1975, Aghamiryan described the impact of the gallery:

Some day future generations will be grateful to the twentieth century not only because it was a time when children's paintings were studied as psychological documents concerning the development of the personality and creativity but also because they aroused the admiration of contemporaries, who showed a deep appreciation of the unexpected beauty of children's art.

International collaboration has been historically important for the museum, with partnerships in the late 1970s with the Brooklyn Centre of Children's Art, as well as a loans program. However, until the 1990s, the work of the institution was undocumented since it fell outside "Soviet guidelines of acceptable artistic expression and educational content" according to Henrik Igityan. Instead the vision, its policy and processes were passed word-of-mouth between Igityan and his colleagues.

=== Legacy ===
In 1980, the magazine Soviet Life described the gallery as "the only one of its kind in the world". It was the success of the Children's Art Museum that led to the foundation of the National Aesthetic Centre, demonstrating a desire for art education in the country.

== See also ==
- Armenian art
- List of museums in Yerevan
