= Capital punishment in Andorra =

Capital punishment in Andorra was abolished in 1990, and was last used in 1943, for the public execution of Pere Areny Aleix. Prior instances of people being sentenced to death were either pardoned or commuted to life in prison.

== History ==
15 people were executed for witchcraft between 1471 and 1661.

In 1854, Co-Prince Josep Caixal i Estradé issued that the manner for carrying out capital punishment be changed from hanging to the garrote. In 1855, Estradé pardoned a man who was sentenced to death. Juan Mandicó murdered Gil Areny on 25 January 1859, and was executed on 29 February 1860, being the only person whose execution used the garrote.

French historian Heliodore Castillon, writing 17 years after the fact, claimed that Masteü el Borni, a smuggler from Catalonia, killed his fellow smuggler Jose Olette on 10 January 1861, and was executed via beheading with a double-edged sword on 11 April. However, there are no eyewitness or documentary sources for this execution.

Manuel Bacó strangled his mother Maria Calva on 11 January 1896, and the death penalty was issued for him. However, his sentence was commuted to life in prison. He was sent to New Caledonia, where he died on 21 April 1898, at the Thió prison's infirmary. The death penalty would not be issued again until 1943.

On 31 July 1943, the 56-year old Antoni Areny Baró was killed by his 29-year-old half-brother Pere Areny with a gun while sleeping at their home in Mas de la Costa. Pere, who did not have a lawyer, was found guilty and sentenced to death on 15 October. Pere was publicly executed by firing squad on 18 October, and this was the last time that capital punishment was used in Andorra. Andorra's law stipulated that the convicted would be executed using a garrote, but World War II meant that an executioner could not be brought in so the court allowed for a firing squad. Capital punishment was abolished in Andorra in 1990.

== Works cited ==
=== Books ===
- Stiles, Kendall (2018). Trust and Hedging in International Relations. University of Michigan Press.

=== News ===
- "Es compleixen 70 anys de la darrera execució al Principat". Bondia. 17 October 2013. Archived from the original on 26 April 2025.
- "Pena de mort a l'andosina: teoria i pràctica". Bondia. 13 September 2021. Archived from the original on 26 April 2025.
- "Robert Pastor, historiador: "Les quinze dones executades per bruixeria les va condemnar Corts"". Bondia. 20 April 2023. Archived from the original on 27 April 2025.
- Gambín, Marta (6 September 2021). "Cuando Andorra mató a su último condenado a muerte". El Nacional. Archived from the original on 26 April 2025.
- Molas, Silvia. "Per què vas matar el teu germà, Pere?". Ara. Archived from the original on 5 September 2021.
- Prat, Meritxell (11 December 2017). "Càstig màxim". Diari d'Andorra. Archived from the original on 26 April 2025.
