= List of fratricides in fiction =

Following is a list of notable fictional fratricides.

== Legend and mythology ==
- Medea killed her brother Apsyrtus in order to help Jason escape Colchis after obtaining the Golden Fleece. (Greek myth)
- In Völuspá, the forecast of the world in Nordic mythology, one of the signs of the end of the world is an increase in fratricides.
- Höðr is manipulated into killing his brother Baldur in Nordic mythology.
- Romulus killed Remus, his twin brother and co-founder of Rome.
- Osiris, one of the principal deities of Egyptian mythology, was murdered by his evil brother Set. His wife and sister Isis resurrected him and he became the god of the dead and the underworld.
- Eteocles and Polynices kill each other in ensuing battle over the throne of Thebes, Greece in Sophocles' Antigone (Sophocles).
- When both change into different armor, Sir Balin and Sir Balan kill each other in a duel, with Balin shortly outliving his brother and realizing what had happened, according to Arthurian Legend.
- The Biblical story of Cain and Abel.
- The Biblical story of 2 Samuel 13, where Absalom kills Amnon after King David, their father, fails to punish Amnon for raping Tamar, their sister.
- The Pandavas killed their brother Karna in the epic Mahabharata but they did not know that Karna was their brother, at the time of his killing.
- Genghis Khan killed his older brother following a dispute.
- In Historia regum Britanniae Porrex, the son of the King of Britain Gorboduc, slew his elder brother Ferrex in a dispute over rule of Britain.

== Literature and film ==
- Claudius killed King Hamlet, his brother, and married his sister-in-law, Gertrude, in order to become King of Denmark in William Shakespeare's Hamlet.
- In the Thomas Harris novel Hannibal, Margot Verger kills her brother Mason as revenge for his abuse of her when they were younger, as she was encouraged to do by her former therapist, Dr. Hannibal Lecter.
- In William Faulkner's Absalom, Absalom!, Henry Sutpen murders his half-brother Charles Bon.
- In Yuval Noah Harari's Sapiens: A Brief History of Humankind prehistoric Homo Sapiens kills all the other homo 'brothers and sisters' species.
- In the ninja anime series Naruto, Sasuke Uchiha kills his brother Itachi Uchiha to avenge the murder of their family.
- In the manga and anime series Ginga Densetsu Weed, Hougen, the tyrannical Great Dane, and one of the villains of the series, is forced kill his younger brother, Genba, after he has a fight with the protagonists, falls and hits his head on a rock, gaining intellectual disability and memory loss. In the anime, Genba has memory loss and becomes so brain-damaged, that he reacts violently to everything around him and attacks Hougen, to which he kills him out of mercy.
- In Idylls of the King Balin and Balan kill each other mistakenly
- In Invincible, the last book in the Star Wars: Legacy of the Force series, Jedi Knight Jaina Solo is forced to kill her twin brother Jacen in a lightsaber duel, after Jacen turns to the dark side of the Force and becomes a Sith Lord.
- In The Vampire Diaries book series, it is revealed that, in a moment of extreme grief over losing the woman they both loved, brothers Damon and Stefan Salvatore get swords and duel. Damon kills Stefan first, but Stefan manages to plunge his sword into Damon before he himself dies. Later, they both wake to find that they have become vampires. In The Vampire Diaries television series, the brothers are instead murdered by their own father for supporting vampires. As in the books, they transition into vampires afterwards.
- In anime series Dragon Ball Z, the main character, Son Goku kills his brother Raditz with the help of Piccolo.
- In One Piece Donquixote Doflamingo kills his younger brother Rocinante after his treason is confirmed.
- In The Skin I Live In Dr Robert Ledgrad kills his half-brother Zeca, unaware that they are brothers.
- In A Song of Ice and Fire, Stannis Baratheon kills his vain and ambitious younger brother Renly Baratheon, Euron Greyjoy slays his half-brothers Harlon and Robyn Greyjoy, and is responsible for the death of his brother Balon Greyjoy, and Ramsay Bolton is suspected of poisoning his half-brother Domeric Bolton.
  - In the prequel series The Tales of Dunk and Egg Prince Maekar Targaryen (later Maekar I), accidentally kills his oldest brother Prince Baelor Targaryen. One of their father Daeron II's half-brothers, Brynden Rivers, is mentioned to have killed another half-brother, King Daemon I Blackfyre, in battle.
  - Another prequel The Princess and the Queen mentions the twin knights Ser Arryk Cargyll and Ser Erryk Cargyll, who slew each other.

== Film and television ==
- In The Legend of Mor'du, the prince Mor'du transformed into a monstrous bear and murdered his 3 younger brothers in cold-blood rather than share the Kingdom with them as their father intended.
- Michael Corleone (in The Godfather Part II) has his brother Fredo shot.
- Scar murders his older brother Mufasa in order to usurp his throne in The Lion King.
- In the 1979 anime, Mobile Suit Gundam, Kycilia Zabi kills her brother, Gihren Zabi, to avenge her father's death.
- In Power Rangers Operation Overdrive, Flurious destroys his own brother Moltor, by freezing him and shattering him.
- In the anime Code Geass, Lelouch Lamperouge kills his half-brother Clovis la Britannia as an act of (partial) revenge, in order to stop a massacre ordered to cover up the loss and recovery of an illegal research subject.
- In the anime Shaman King, Yoh Asakura kills his twin brother Hao in order to prevent his genocidal agenda against humanity.
- The Flame King killed his own brother in "Ignition Point" the episode of Adventure Time.
- In the season 1 finale of Dexter, Dexter Morgan murders his older brother, Brian Moser the "Ice-Truck Killer". This is the conclusion of a major story arc in the first season.
- In the second episode of the third season of NCIS Mossad Officer Ziva David shoots her paternal half brother Ari Hazwari in defense of NCIS Special Agent Gibbs. It was later revealed that Ziva and Ari's shared father Eli David ordered the killing of his son to gain the trust of NCIS but ultimately, Ziva shot Ari to save Gibbs.
- Nino Brown kills his brother G Money in New Jack City for disloyalty, and as the only way for Nino to start over. G Money asks "am I my brother's keeper".
- In From Dusk till Dawn, Seth kills his brother Richie, who has turned into a vampire. Kate is forced to do the same with her brother, Scott.
- In Harper's Island, Henry Dunn kills his brother JD at a rainy boat dock.
- In Star Trek: The Next Generation, Data is forced to kill his brother Lore.
- In Halloween H20: 20 Years Later Laurie Strode allegedly decapitates her older brother serial killer Michael Myers with an ax, but in Halloween: Resurrection, it's revealed that the latter switched places with a paramedic.
- In One Tree Hill Season 3, Episode 16, Dan Scott kills his older brother Keith Scott during a school shooting, because he believes he tried to kill him first in a fire.

== Video games ==
- In Fatal Frame II: Crimson Butterfly, when twin girls were not available, twin brothers were used in a ritual in which one brother strangles the other. The one documented occurrence of this is when Itsuki Tachibana killed his brother Mutsuki. It is implied that Ryokan Kurosawa, the father of Yae and Sae Kurosawa, also killed his twin brother.
- In Final Fantasy XII, Vayne Solidor, the main antagonist and eventual final boss, kills two of his older brothers at the order of his father, Emperor Gramis Solidor (whom Vayne eventually kills as well), only before he is ironically killed by the player's party with assistance from his brother, Larsa.
- In Legacy of Kain: Soul Reaver, Raziel kills his vampire brothers as he seeks out his creator Kain.
- In the Metal Gear series, Solid Snake commits fratricide, patricide and, unknowingly, matricide.
- In Devil May Cry, Dante kills his twin brother Vergil (under the guise of Nelo Angelo), unaware of the fact that Nelo Angelo was actually his twin brother. In the novels, he thought he had killed Vergil after shooting him while he was under the guise of Gilver.
- In Mortal Kombat: Deception, Noob Saibot's (non canon) ending shows him violently murdering his own brother, Sub-Zero with the help of Smoke by ripping him in half.
- In World in Conflict: Soviet Assault the overzealous and brainwashed Soviet Captain Malashenko kills his commanding officer Colonel Orlovsky, who is also his uncle, after the Colonel goes against orders to save his men.
- In Galerians, protagonist Rion Steiner kills his "brother" Cain, who strongly resembles him.
- In Portal, the player earns the "Fratricide" achievement upon destroying the Weighted Companion Cube.
- In one of the endings of Baroque, the protagonist kills his twin brother.
- In Grandia II, the protagonist Ryudo is forced to defeat (and thus kill) his demon-possessed brother Melfice.
- In Baldur's Gate, the player character will fight against, and kill, his or her half-brother Sarevok.
- In Baldur's Gate II: Throne of Bhaal the player character will fight and kill a number of his or her half-brother and half-sisters—the Bhaalspawn—including Illasera, Gromnir Il-Khan, Sendai, Abazigal and Balthazar, collectively known as "The Five".
- At the end of the storyline of the video game Grand Theft Auto: Chinatown Wars, Huang's uncle Kenny Lee is found out to be the one who had Huang's father killed by two men, who was Kenny Lee's brother, which Huang was trying to find out at the start of the game, and avenge his father's death.
- In Undead Knights, Romulus Blood, a human knight turned demonic necromancer, accidentally kills his younger brother Remus in an exhausted rage.
- In Grand Theft Auto IV the playable character, Niko Bellic will be given a choice of killing one of two brothers, the police officer Francis McReary or his brother Derrick McReary, who each have asked him to kill the other.
- In Hatoful Boyfriend Yuuya Sakazaki was ordered to murder his brother, but killed his half-brother instead.
- In Overwatch, when Genji Shimada refused to change his behavior for the good of his family's business, his brother Hanzo was forced to kill him, though Genji ultimately survived.
- In the Borderlands franchise, Crimson Lance mercenary Athena is tricked into killing her sister.
- In Five Nights at Freddy's 4, it was implied that the older brother killed the crying child after the former shoved his brother's head into Fredbear's mouth.
