= Pere Areny =

Andorran murderer (1913–1943)

- Born: Pere Areny Aleix; 1913; Canillo, Andorra
- Died: 18 October 1943 (aged 29); Canillo, Andorra
- Status: Executed by firing squad
- Criminal charge: Fratricide
- Penalty: Death

Details
- Victims: Antoni Areny

Pere Areny Aleix (1913 – 18 October 1943) was an Andorran man who was the last person to be executed by Andorra.

Areny was convicted of the August 1943 murder of his half-brother and publicly executed by firing squad. The case was the subject of a book by author Iñaki Rubio Manzano, who analyses the nuances surrounding the case and the context of the then ongoing World War II.

== Background and crime ==
Pere Areny Aleix was born in Canillo, Andorra, in 1913, the youngest of seven children of Antoni Areny Duedra and his second wife Rosa Baró Duró. The elder Areny had two other children from a previous marriage, the oldest being Antoni, who was born in 1887. According to the testimonies of his family, his descendants, as well as researchers, Areny suffered from paranoid schizophrenia. In the year of the crime and his subsequent execution, one of Areny's sisters was committed to a psychiatric hospital due to the same pathology.

Some time before 3 a.m. on 1 August 1943, Areny shot and killed his 56-year-old half-brother Antoni while he slept in one of the bedrooms of the family's manor house. Areny then exited the room and went to tell his sister, Àngela, desisting from doing so when she told him that she wanted to sleep. Areny went out and hid the 12-gauge shotgun in the barn and waited for the sun to rise. At dawn he approached neighbours and informed them of Antoni's death but did not confess to killing him. Police arrived shortly afterwards and arrested him.

== Legal proceedings and execution ==
The killing of Antoni Areny shocked Andorrans, who were not used to seeing homicides taking place in the country. Following his arrest, Areny was interrogated by local authorities and subsequently charged with his half-brother's murder. Due to the context of World War II and Andorra's position under heavy influence from Spain, the proceedings against Areny were marked by quick decisions from the courts, with an interval of less than two days between sentencing and execution.

In November 2013, a spokesman for the Cal Gastó residence, where the crime occurred in Canillo, told media that police in 1943 based their accusation that Areny murdered his half-brother in order to receive the family's inheritance on their sister Àngela, who was mentally unstable and later committed to a psychiatric hospital in Barcelona, where she died in 1981. The official added that the courts did not take into consideration the issue of Areny's likely mental health problems and that he suffered from paranoid schizophrenia and hallucinations.

Catalan author Iñaki Rubio released a book in August 2021 narrating the case and pointing to the mishandling of the legal proceedings by the Andorran authorities of that time, who were, in Rubio's view, heavily influenced by political and religious motives when they sought the death penalty against Areny. The book also analyses the myths and unconfirmed reports that surrounded the case, including that Areny had confessed to having previously killed one of his sisters and that his brother mistreated and humiliated him.

Areny was put on trial on 15 October 1943, accused of the fratricide of his older brother Antoni. The Tribunal de Corts found him guilty in a matter of hours and sentenced him to death. In the hours preceding the execution, one of the six police officers on duty in the city at the time resigned from his position, citing strong disagreements with the Tribunal for not sparing Areny's life and to save himself from sharing responsibility over his death.

On 18 October 1943, Areny was publicly executed by a firing squad in Canillo in front of the town's neighbours. He was 29 years old and became the last person to be executed by Andorra. José Maria Malagelada, a Catalan lawyer who witnessed the execution, detailed the proceeding in a document that he left in public records in Andorra la Vella. Malagelada stated that if any of those who were present in Canillo would have asked the authorities for clemency for Areny, the Tribunal would have likely spared his life and would have imposed a sentence of life in prison. In the document he also wrote that Canillo officials decided to put Areny to death by firing squad after the context of the war complicated the task of finding an executioner in Spain or France to apply the garrote, which was the first legal method in Andorra.

The country abolished capital punishment in 1990 and ratified its abolition in the Constitution of Andorra adopted three years later.

== See also ==
- List of most recent executions by jurisdiction
