= A Fratricide =

- Short story by Franz Kafka
- Original title: Ein Brudermord

Publication
- Publication date: 1917

"A Fratricide" (German: Ein Brudermord) is a short story by Franz Kafka written between December 1916 and January 1917. It is one of Kafka's most realistically descriptive and graphically violent stories, and tells the story of a murderer, Schmar, and his victim, Wese. Although no clear motive for the murder is given anywhere in the story, it can be ascertained that the crime is a matter of jealous passion. Apart from the title, there is no obvious indication that the two characters are brothers, and the title may be an allusion to the biblical story of Cain and Abel.

An important element of the story is the character of Pallas, a passive observer who witnesses the entire drama and whose intervention might have saved Wese's life. Wese's wife, Julia, is also mentioned in the story: she is said to be waiting for him because he had been unusually late the night of the murder.
