= Fratricide =

Act of killing one's own brother

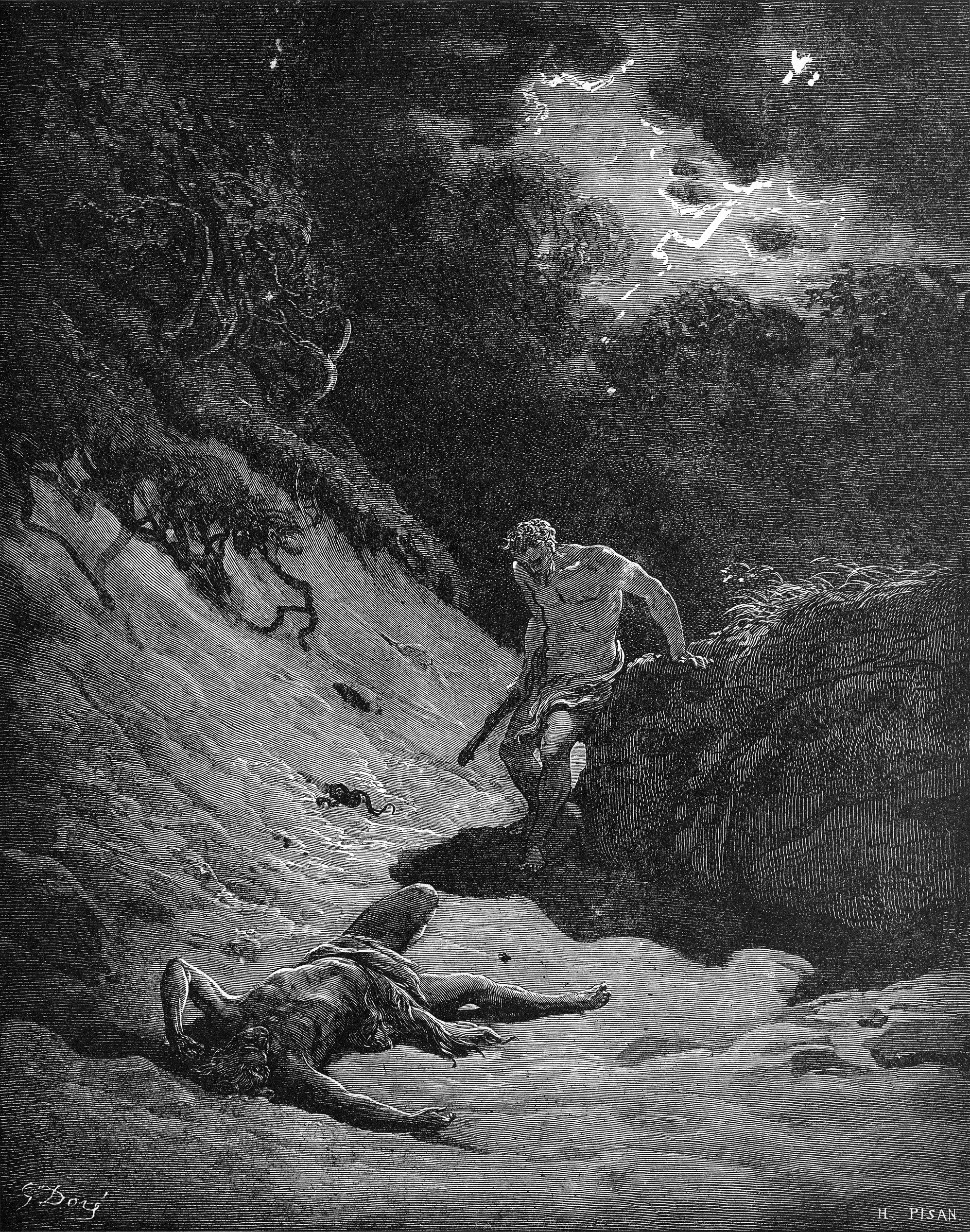
Cain kills Abel, a fratricide illustrated by Gustave Doré ("And Cain talked with Abel his brother; and it came to pass, when they were in the field, that Cain rose up against Abel his brother and slew him.")

Fratricide (from Latin fratricidium; from frater 'brother' and -cīdium 'killing' – the assimilated root of caedere 'to kill, cut down') is the act of killing one's own brother.

It can either be done directly or via the use of either a hired or an indoctrinated intermediary (an assassin). The victim need not be the perpetrator's biological brother. In a military context, fratricide refers to a service member killing a comrade.

The term is often used metaphorically to refer to civil wars.

== Religion and mythology ==
The Abrahamic religions recognize the biblical account of Cain and Abel as the first fratricidal murder. Esau swore to kill Jacob after Jacob stole his blessings, and later, Jacob's sons planned to kill Joseph, but instead sold him. Judge Gideon's son, Avimelech, killed his seventy brothers, except for the youngest, Jotham, who escaped.

In the mythology of ancient Rome, the city is founded as the result of a fratricide, with the twins Romulus and Remus quarreling over who has the favour of the gods and over each other's plans to build Rome, with Romulus becoming Rome's first king and namesake after killing his brother.

In Greek mythology, Cassiphone, the daughter of Odysseus and Circe, killed her half-brother and husband Telemachus in revenge after he killed her mother Circe following a quarrel between the two.

=== Osiris Myth ===
In ancient Egyptian mythology, the god Osiris is murdered by his brother Set who usurps the throne.

=== The Mahabharata and the Ramayana ===
In the Hindu epic Mahābhārata, Karna was killed by Arjuna who was unaware that Karna was his eldest brother.

== Roman Empire ==
The only known fratricides in the Roman Empire are Romulus killing Remus and the reasonably well-known murder of Geta on the orders of his brother Caracalla in 211. The brothers had a fraught relationship enduring many years; upon their father Septimius Severus's death in February 211, they succeeded him as co-emperors. Their joint rule was embittered and unsuccessful, with each of them conspiring to have the other one murdered. In December of that year, Caracalla pretended to be holding a reconciliation in their mother Julia Domna's apartment when Geta was lured to come unarmed and unguarded. A group of Centurions loyal to Caracalla ambushed him upon Geta's arrival, with Geta dying in his mother's arms. It is said that the fratricide would often come back to haunt Caracalla.

== Persian Empire ==
There are many recorded fratricides in Persia, the most famous of which involving Cyrus the Great's sons Cambyses II and Bardiya, the former killing the latter. There are also stories about the sons of Artaxerxes I, Xerxes II, Sogdianus, and Darius II, all of which concern competition for the throne. In addition, there were many fratricides recorded during the Parthian and Sassanid Empires.

== Tang Empire ==
Prince Li Shimin (Prince of Qin), the second son of Emperor Gaozu, was in an intense rivalry with his elder brother Crown Prince Li Jiancheng and younger brother Prince Li Yuanji (Prince of Qi). He took control and set up an ambush at Xuanwu Gate, the northern gate leading to the Palace City of the imperial capital Chang'an. There, Li Jiancheng and Li Yuanji were murdered by Li Shimin and his men. Within three days after the coup, Li Shimin was installed as the crown prince. Emperor Gaozu abdicated another sixty days later and passed the throne to Li Shimin, who would become known as Emperor Taizong.

== Ottoman Empire ==
Fratricide was not originally legal in the Ottoman Empire. The practice of fratricide was legalized by Mehmed II. His grandfather, Mehmed I, struggled over the throne with his brothers Süleyman, İsa, and Musa during the Ottoman Interregnum. This civil war lasted eight years and weakened the empire due to the casualties it inflicted and the division it sowed in Ottoman society. As a result, Mehmed II formally legalized the practice of fratricide in order to preserve the state and not further place strain on the unity as previous civil wars did. Mehmed II stated, "Of any of my sons that ascends the throne, it is acceptable for him to kill his brothers for the common benefit of the people (nizam-i alem). The majority of the ulama (Muslim scholars) have approved this; let action be taken accordingly."

When Mehmed's son, Bayezid II died, his son Selim I immediately assumed the throne and proceeded to execute his two brothers Ahmed and Korkut. The largest practice of fratricide was committed by Mehmed III when he had 19 of his brothers murdered and buried alongside their father. His successor Ahmed I, when faced with public disapproval for the practice of fratricide, decided to outlaw the practice and replace it with seniority ascension system along with imprisonment in the Kafes of any prince who would be a possible threat to the throne.

== Mughal Empire ==
In the Mughal Empire, fratricides often occurred as a result of wars of succession. Shah Jahan had his eldest brother Khusrau Mirza killed in 1622. Shah Jahan also had his brother Shahriyar killed in 1628. Shah Jahan's son, Dara Shikoh was assassinated by four of his brother Aurangzeb's henchmen in front of his terrified son on the night of 30 August 1659 (9 September Gregorian).

== Antigone ==
The events in the Greek tragedy Antigone unfold due to the previous war between the princely brothers, Eteocles and Polyneices, who killed each other in combat. Polyneices had challenged his brother's claim to the throne of the city Thebes, and attacked the city with an army from Argos. Eteocles fought for Thebes to defend the city against Polyneices and his army. The two killed each other by stabbing in the heart.

== Ashoka's Empire ==
Ashoka, also known as Chand-Ashoka (Cruel Ashoka), killed his brothers as punishment for the king's (his father) death and quarrel for the kingdom (war of succession). Later on, Ashoka conquered Greater India entire, before he adopted Buddhism and forsook war.

== Zulu Kingdom ==
Shaka, the Zulu king, was killed by his half-brother Dingane and his brother Mhlangana in 1828. Dingane became the Zulu leader until he was assassinated in 1840 in the Hlatikhulu Forest.

== 20th century ==
On 1 August 1943 in Canillo, Andorra, Pere Areny shot and killed his half-brother Antoni while the victim slept. Areny was arrested and quickly tried on a count of fratricide. He was publicly executed by firing squad on 18 October 1943, becoming the last person to be executed by Andorra.

Between 1965 and 1966, 12-year-old Piedad Martínez del Águila killed four of her younger siblings, including two brothers, in the del Águila family killings.

== 21st century ==
- In 2008, Erin Caffey planned the murder of her younger brothers and mother in the Caffey family murders.
- In 2010, Derrick Bird killed his twin brother and then eleven other people using a shotgun and a .22 caliber rifle in Cumbria, England.
- In 2015, Robert and Michael Bever murdered their two younger brothers in the Broken Arrow murders.
- On March 25, 2022, rapper Archie Eversole, known for his 2002 song “We Ready”, was shot in the head by his brother. Eversole died of his injuries on April 3, 2022.
- In early September of 2022, Myles Sanderson killed his brother, Damien, and ten other people as well as wounding seventeen others in a mass stabbing.

== See also ==
- A Fratricide by Franz Kafka
- List of fratricides in fiction
- Cain and Abel
- Romulus and Remus
- Friendly fire, fratricide in the martial sense
- List of types of killing § Killing of family
