= Església de Sant Pere del Tarter =

Church in El Tarter, Andorra

Coordinates: 42.5787°N 1.6531°E

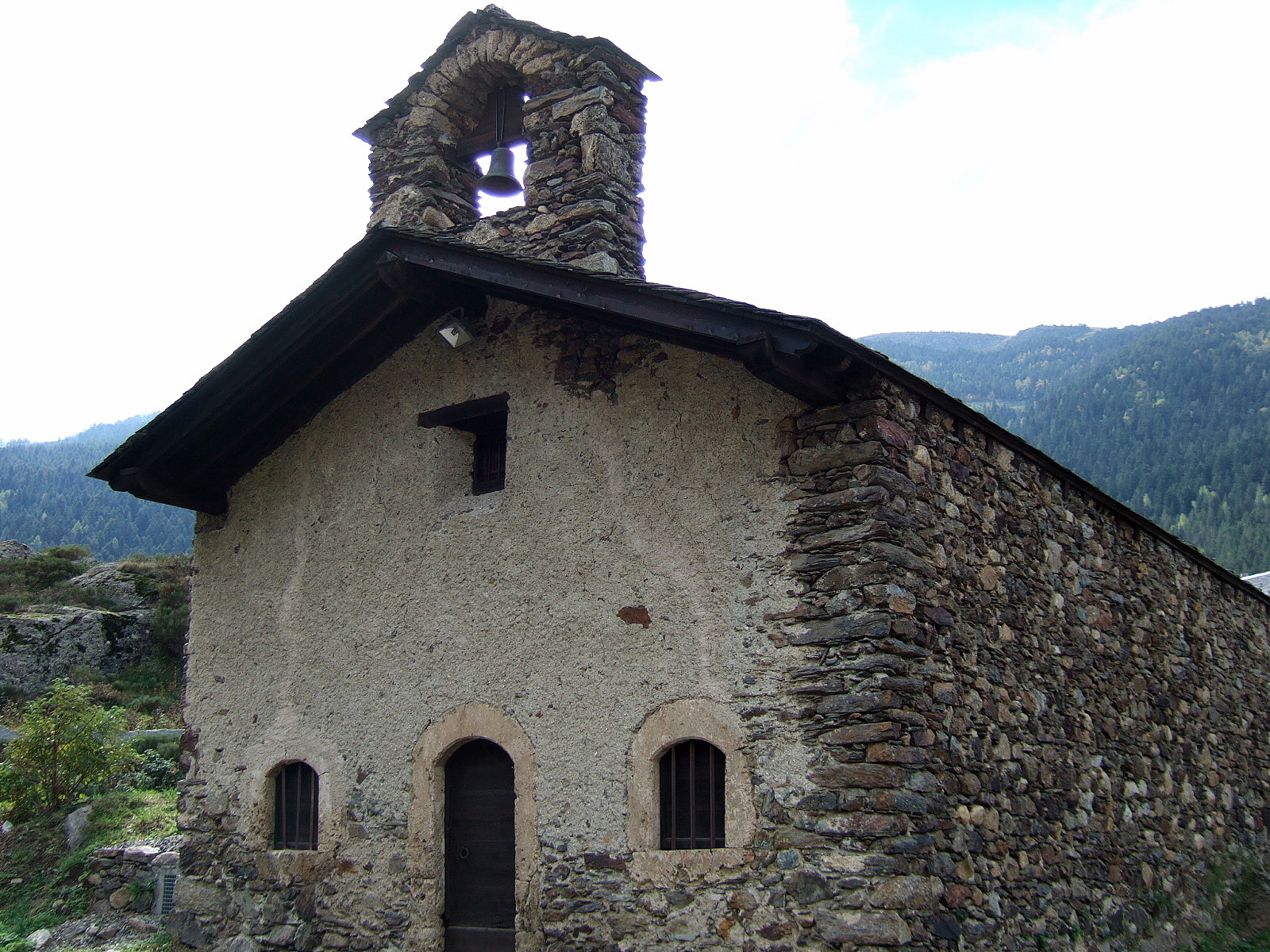
Església de Sant Pere del Tarter

Església de Sant Pere del Tarter is a church located in El Tarter, Canillo Parish, Andorra. It is a heritage property registered in the Cultural Heritage of Andorra. It was built in the 16th century.
